= U.S. Route 240 =

Highway in the District of Columbia

U.S. Route 240
- Washington National Pike; Wisconsin Avenue
- US 240 highlighted in red, US 240 Alt. in blue, and US 240 Truck in pink

Route information
- Auxiliary route of US 40
- Existed: 1926–1972

Major junctions
- South end: US 50 in Washington, D.C.
- I-270 / MD 355 near Bethesda, MD; I-70 in Frederick, MD
- North end: US 40 in Frederick, MD

Location
- Country: United States
- States: District of Columbia, Maryland
- Counties: DC: Washington; MD: Montgomery, Frederick

Highway system
- United States Numbered Highway System; List; Special; Divided
← MD 239	MD	→ MD 242
← US 211	DC	→ I-270

U.S. Route 240 is a defunct designation for a short, but once very important, segment of highway between Frederick, Maryland, and Washington, D.C. It is now commonly known as Wisconsin Avenue, Maryland Route 355 (MD 355), and Interstate 270 (I-270).

== Route description ==
This route description features US 240 as it existed in 1945, with references to today's highways to provide context.

=== Washington, D.C. ===
US 240 began at the intersection of Pennsylvania Avenue and 14th Street, NW, near the White House in Washington, D.C. US 240 headed west on Pennsylvania Avenue to 15th Street, then headed west from that intersection on Treasury Place for one block (entering an area now closed to the public and known as President's Park). The U.S. Highway curved around the south side of the South Lawn on South Executive Avenue past the Zero Milestone Marker to continue onto E Street west one block to 17th Street. US 240 followed 17th Street north to Farragut Square, where the highway intersected K Street, which carried US 50.

US 240 continued north along Connecticut Avenue to Dupont Circle, which did not have an underpass for Connecticut Avenue when US 240 was designated. At the circle, the U.S. Highway met US 29, which used New Hampshire Avenue on both sides of the circle, and US 240 Alternate, which headed north on Connecticut Avenue. US 240 continued northwest on Massachusetts Avenue. The highway passed through Sheridan Circle, crossed Rock Creek on what is now named the Charles C. Glover Memorial Bridge, and passed along part of Observatory Circle on the edge of the circular U.S. Naval Observatory grounds. US 240 followed Massachusetts Avenue to its intersection with Wisconsin Avenue next to Washington National Cathedral. There, the U.S. Highway turned north and followed Wisconsin Avenue through Tenleytown to the District of Columbia boundary at Western Avenue in Friendship Heights.

By 1959, the starting point and routing of US 240 south of Massachusetts Avenue and 22nd Street (one block east of Sheridan Circle) had changed. The southern terminus was at the traffic circle around the Lincoln Memorial (which carried US 50) heading north on 23rd Street, NW, passing through Washington Circle where it intersected with US 29 which headed west on K St. and northeast on New Hampshire Avenue. Due to one-way roads the north and southbound lanes of US 240 ran on different streets for the next six blocks. Northbound US 240 followed New Hampshire Avenue (and US 29) northeast for one block and then turning directly north on 22nd Street (one way northbound) to Massachusetts Avenue, where it turned northwest. Southbound from Massachusetts Avenue on 22nd it forked onto 23rd Street (one way southbound) to Washington Circle. The southern terminus of US 240 Alternate was rerouted down Florida Avenue from Connecticut Avenue to connect with US 240 at the intersection of Massachusetts Avenue, 22nd Street, and Florida Avenue.

=== Maryland ===
US 240 followed a divided highway north to its intersection with MD 191, which as today headed west as Bradley Boulevard, a divided highway, and east as Bradley Lane. The U.S. highway became undivided and intersected MD 82 (Leland Street) and crossed over the Georgetown Branch of the Baltimore and Ohio Railroad before meeting the southern and western ends of MD 187 (Old Georgetown Road) and MD 410 (East–West Highway), respectively, in the center of Bethesda. This intersection also served as the northern end of US 240 Alternate, which headed east along MD 410 to Connecticut Avenue, which was then MD 193 and is now MD 185. North of Bethesda, US 240 met the western end of MD 702 (Jones Bridge Road) just south of the National Naval Medical Center. The highway descended into the valley of Rock Creek then left the valley and met the western end of MD 547 (Strathmore Avenue).

US 240 intersected Montrose Road and then the northern end of MD 187 (Old Georgetown Road) at the village of Montrose. The highway began to parallel the Baltimore and Ohio Railroad (now CSX's Metropolitan Subdivision) as it approached the town of Rockville. US 240 entered the county seat at Dodge Street and had an acute intersection with MD 28 (Viers Mill Road). The two highways ran concurrently northwest along a street that no longer exists to Montgomery Avenue, then west on Montgomery Avenue to Washington Street. There, MD 28 continued west on Montgomery Avenue and US 240 continued out of town on Washington Street. The U.S. Highway paralleled the railroad to Derwood, where the highway intersected MD 688 (Redland Road) just north of Indianola Drive. US 240 intersected Shady Grove Road and entered the town of Gaithersburg at Summit Avenue. The highway crossed over the Baltimore and Ohio Railroad between a pair of oblique intersections with MD 124 (West and East Diamond Avenue), which ran concurrently with US 240 across the railroad.

US 240 continued north from Gaithersburg across Great Seneca Creek to the hamlets of Middlebrook and Neelsville. In the latter location, the highway met the northern end of MD 118 (Germantown Road) at what is now Boland Farm Road and the southern end of MD 27 (Ridge Road) at what is presently Henderson Corner Road. US 240 crossed Little Seneca Creek and had a pair of staggered intersections with MD 121 (Clarksburg Road); the latter highway followed what are now Spire Street and Redgrave Place north and south, respectively. The U.S. Highway crossed Little Bennett Creek just south of the village of Hyattstown, where the highway intersected Old Hundred Road; MD 109 did not yet extend to Hyattstown. Just north of Hyattstown, US 240 crossed the Montgomery–Frederick county line and met the southern end of MD 75 (Green Valley Road).

US 240 crossed Bennett Creek as it approached Urbana, through which the highway ran concurrently with MD 80 (Fingerboard Road). The U.S. Highway descended into the valley of the Monocacy River, which the highway crossed just south of its bridge across the Old Main Line of the Baltimore and Ohio Railroad at Frederick Junction. South of the city limits of Frederick, US 240 had an oblique intersection with US 15 (Buckeystown Pike) just south of the modern intersection of MD 355 and MD 85. US 15 and US 240 entered Frederick together along Market Street. The U.S. Highways crossed Carroll Creek before US 240 ended at US 40 (Patrick Street) in the center of downtown Frederick. US 15 continued north along Market Street toward Gettysburg.

== History ==
U.S. 240's original route between Maryland Route 109 and Maryland Route 85 (then part of U.S. 15) was supplanted by a new freeway alignment in 1953; U.S. 240 was diverted away from its original route onto the new freeway as it was completed south to the future alignment of the Capital Beltway. In 1956, with the arrival of the Interstate Highway System, the route gained the designation Interstate 70S (now Interstate 270).

In Maryland, the whole of U.S. 240 was redesignated as Maryland Route 355 around 1970. U.S. 240 crossed into Washington, D.C., on Wisconsin Avenue, it turns southeast onto Massachusetts Avenue (Washington, D.C.) and then south-southeast onto Connecticut Avenue at Dupont Circle. It reached U.S. Route 50 at K Street and by 1968 extended to the area around the Lincoln Memorial . Signs for U.S. 240 within Washington existed at least into the early 1970s, when the route was deleted in its entirety, leaving I-70S (now I-270) as the sole route following the original freeway.

In addition, Alternate U.S. 240 ran along Connecticut Avenue through Washington, D.C., and Maryland inside the Washington Beltway with its southern end at the intersection with U.S. 240 at Dupont Circle.

== Junction list ==
This table shows the intersections of US 240 as they existed in 1945.

County	Location	mi	km	Destinations	Notes
City of Washington				US 1 (14th Street) / DC 4 east / DC 5 south (Pennsylvania Avenue) – Richmond, Baltimore, Upper Marlboro	Southern terminus; intersection of E Street, 14th Street, and Pennsylvania Avenue
City of Washington				US 50 (K Street) – Annapolis, Arlington	Intersection of 17th Street, K Street, and Connecticut Avenue
City of Washington				US 29 / US 240 Alt. / Massachusetts Avenue east – Baltimore, Arlington	Dupont Circle; southern terminus of US 240 Alt.
Western Avenue				District of Columbia–Maryland boundary	
Montgomery	Chevy Chase			MD 191 (Bradley Boulevard / Bradley Lane) – Potomac	
Montgomery	Chevy Chase			MD 82 (Leland Street)	Intersection of MD 355 and Leland Street
Montgomery	Bethesda			US 240 Alt. south / MD 410 east (East–West Highway) / MD 187 north (Old Georgetown Road) – Washington, Silver Spring, Rockville	Northern terminus of US 240 Alt.; western terminus of MD 410; southern terminus of MD 187
Montgomery	Bethesda			MD 702 east (Jones Bridge Road)	Western terminus of MD 702; intersection of MD 355 and Jones Bridge Road
Montgomery				MD 547 east (Strathmore Avenue) – Garrett Park, Kensington	Western terminus of MD 547
Montgomery				Montrose Road	Near intersection of MD 355 and Montrose Parkway
Montgomery				MD 187 south (Old Georgetown Road) – Bethesda	Northern terminus of MD 187; intersection of MD 355 and Hoya Street
Montgomery	Rockville			MD 28 (Veirs Mill Road) to MD 586 – Norbeck, Wheaton	Southern end of MD 28 concurrency
Montgomery	Rockville			MD 28 (Montgomery Avenue) to MD 189 – Darnestown, Potomac	Northern end of MD 28 concurrency; intersection of Montgomery Avenue and Washington Street
Montgomery	Derwood			MD 688 east (Redland Road) – Redland	Western terminus of MD 688; intersection of MD 355 and Paramount Drive
Montgomery	Gaithersburg			MD 124 west (West Diamond Avenue) – Germantown	Southern end of MD 124 concurrency; near intersection of MD 355 and MD 117A
Montgomery	Gaithersburg			MD 124 east (East Diamond Avenue) – Washington Grove	Northern end of MD 124 concurrency; near intersection of MD 355 and Brookes Avenue
Montgomery				MD 118 south (Germantown Road) – Germantown	Northern terminus of MD 118; intersection of MD 355 and Boland Farm Road
Montgomery				MD 27 north (Ridge Road) – Damascus	Southern terminus of MD 27; intersection of MD 355 and Henderson Corner Road
Montgomery	Clarksburg			MD 121 south (Germantown Road) – Boyds	Southern end of MD 121 concurrency; intersection of MD 355 and Redgrave Place
Montgomery	Clarksburg			MD 121 north (Germantown Road)	Northern end of MD 121 concurrency; intersection of MD 355 and Spire Street
Frederick	Hyattstown			MD 75 (Green Valley Road) – New Market	
Frederick	Urbana			MD 80 east (Fingerboard Road) – Damascus	Southern end of MD 80 concurrency; intersection of MD 355 and MD 80
Frederick	Urbana			MD 80 west (Fingerboard Road) – Buckeystown	Northern end of MD 80 concurrency; intersection of MD 355 and Old MD 80
Frederick	Frederick			US 15 south (Buckeystown Pike) – Buckeystown, Leesburg	Southern end of US 15 concurrency; near intersection of MD 355 and MD 85
Frederick	Frederick			US 15 north (Market Street) / US 40 (Patrick Street) to US 340 – Hagerstown, Baltimore, Gettysburg, Harpers Ferry	Northern terminus; northern end of US 15 concurrency; intersection of Market Street and MD 144FA
1.000 mi = 1.609 km; 1.000 km = 0.621 mi: Concurrency terminus
