= Maryland Route 121 =

State highway in Montgomery County, Maryland, United States, known as Clarksburg Rd

Maryland Route 121
- Clarksburg Road
- Maryland Route 121 highlighted in red

Route information
- Maintained by MDSHA
- Length: 3.96 mi (6.37 km)
- Existed: 1927–present

Major junctions
- South end: MD 117 in Boyds
- I-270 in Clarksburg
- North end: Stringtown Road in Clarksburg

Location
- Country: United States
- State: Maryland
- Counties: Montgomery

Highway system
- Maryland highway system; Interstate; US; State; Scenic Byways
← MD 119	→ MD 122

Maryland Route 121 (MD 121) is a state highway in the U.S. state of Maryland. Known as Clarksburg Road, the highway runs 3.96 miles (6.37 km) from MD 117 in Boyds north to Stringtown Road between Interstate 270 (I-270) and MD 355 in Clarksburg. MD 121 connects Boyds and Clarksburg in northern Montgomery County. The highway was paved from Clarksburg to Boyds in the early to mid-1910s. MD 121 was extended to north of Clarksburg in the late 1920s and early 1930s. MD 121 was relocated through Clarksburg in the mid-1950s when I-270 was constructed through the area. The highway's northern end was rolled back to MD 355 in the mid-1970s. MD 121 was relocated in Boyds in the mid-1980s. The highway's northern end was moved to its present terminus just north of I-270 when Stringtown Road was constructed in the mid-2000s. In addition to the Boyds–Clarksburg route, MD 121 has also included three disjoint segments in Dawsonville and Germantown. All three of these routes were segments of the original MD 119.

== Route description ==
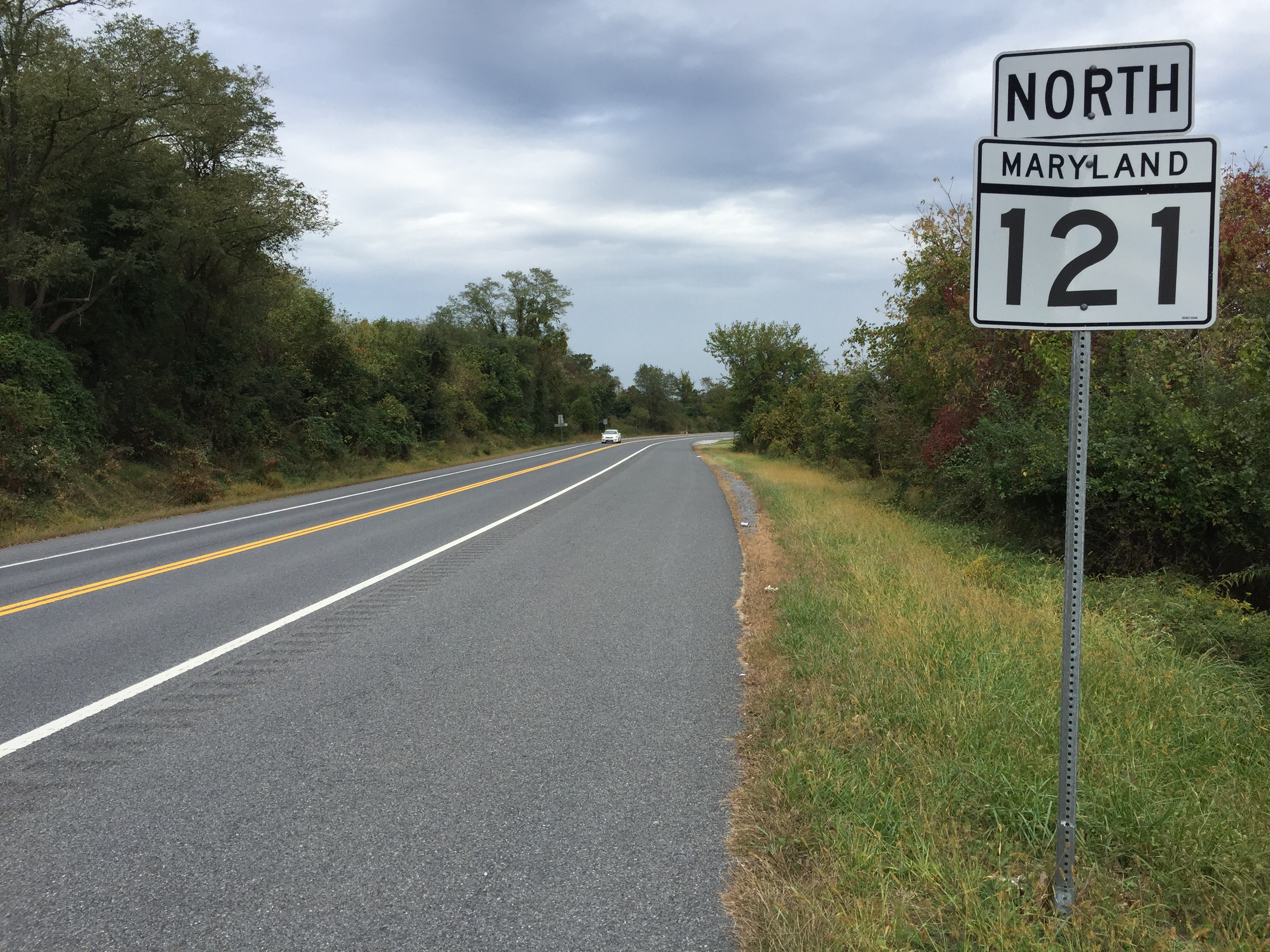
View north along MD 121 at MD 117 in Boyds

MD 121 begins at a T intersection with MD 117 in the village of Boyds. MD 117 heads west along Barnesville Road and south along a continuation of Clarksburg Road, which passes under CSX's Metropolitan Subdivision railroad line next to the Boyds station on MARC's Brunswick Line. MD 121 heads north as a two-lane undivided road that crosses the Tenmile Creek branch of Little Seneca Lake. The highway passes through the hamlet of Burdette and intersects Old Baltimore Road, which provides access to Black Hill Regional Park to the east. On the southern edge of the developed area of Clarksburg, the route expands to a four-lane divided highway and comes to roundabouts with Cabin Branch Avenue and the entrance to the Clarksburg Premium Outlets to the southeast of the road. Following this, MD 121 has a four-ramp partial cloverleaf interchange with I-270 (Eisenhower Memorial Highway). Just north of the route's bridge across of the freeway, the highway reaches its northern terminus where the ramp from northbound I-270 merges onto northbound MD 121. The divided highway continues as Stringtown Road, a county highway that serves as one of the main streets through the developed part of Clarksburg and intersects MD 355 (Frederick Road).

== History ==
Maryland Route 119
- Location: Dawsonville, Germantown
- Existed: 1927–1958

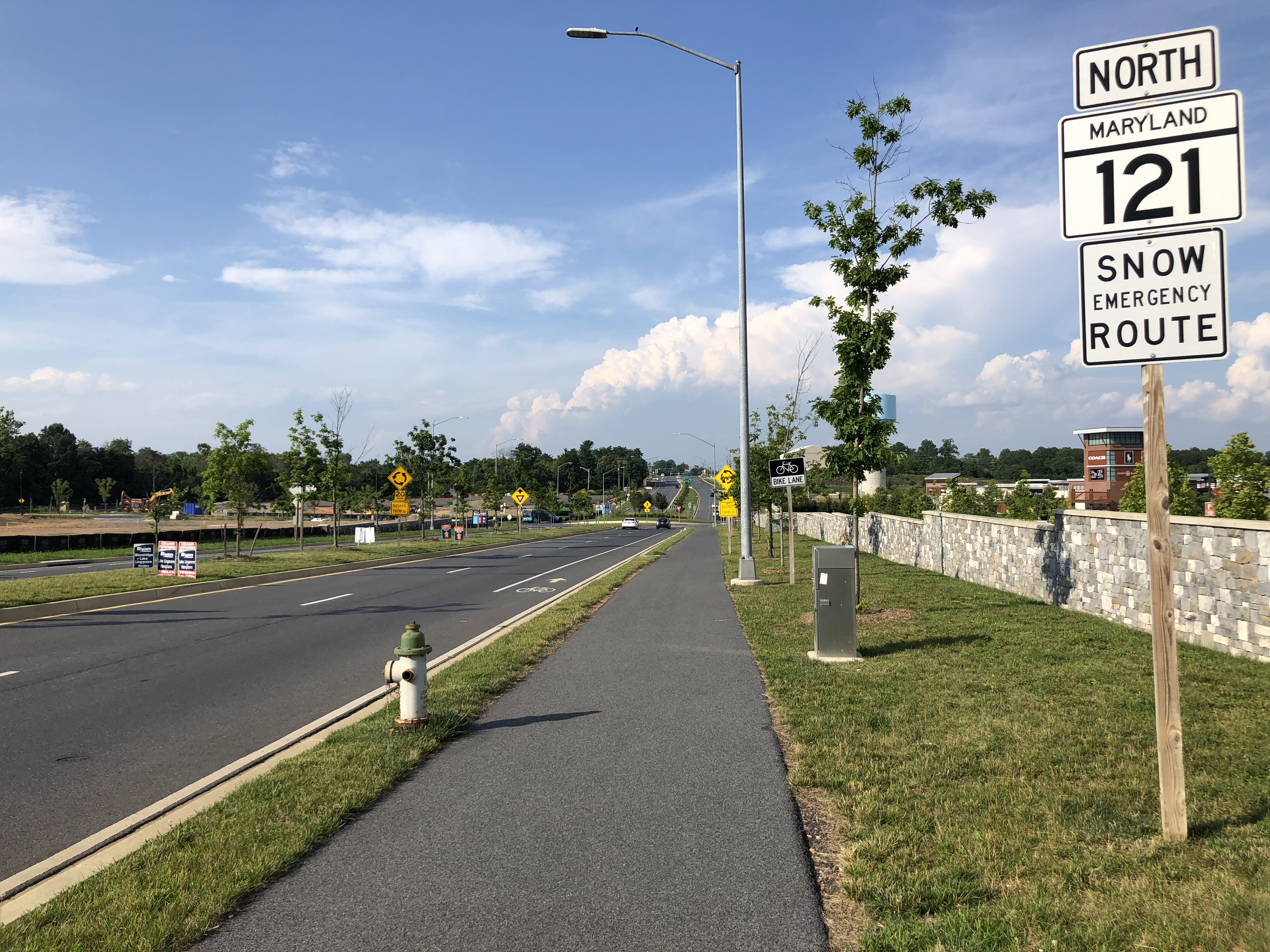
MD 121 northbound south of interchange with I-270 in Clarksburg

The first segment of MD 121 was constructed as a macadam road from Clarksburg to north of Tenmile Creek by 1910. The highway was extended south as a 14-foot-wide (4.3 m) macadam road south to Boyds by 1915. Both stretches of the Boyds–Clarksburg road were built by Montgomery County with state aid. In 1929 and 1930, MD 121 was extended north from U.S. Route 240 (now MD 355) as a concrete road along Clarksburg Road to Burnt Hill Road. This concrete road was extended along Burnt Hill Road to Kingsley Road between 1932 and 1934. Washington National Pike (now I-270) was constructed through Clarksburg and the freeway's interchange with MD 121 was built between 1952 and 1954. In conjunction with the freeway construction, MD 121 was relocated west of the center of the village, leaving behind what are now Redgrave Place south of MD 355 and Spire Street north of MD 355. MD 121 was removed from Burnt Hill Road and Clarksburg Road north of MD 355 between 1975 and 1977. Between 1984 and 1987, MD 121 was relocated at its southern end at Boyds due to the construction of Little Seneca Lake. The state highway had previously met MD 117 west of that highway's railroad underpass at a T intersection through which MD 117 formed the east–west primary road through the intersection. MD 121's northern terminus was rolled back to the northern end of the I-270 interchange in 2007 when county-maintained Stringtown Road was completed from the I-270 interchange to MD 355. The disconnected part of Clarksburg Road west of Stringtown Road and south of MD 355 became MD 121A.

MD 121 has had three disjoint segments in Germantown and Dawsonville that have never connected with the main Boyds–Clarksburg route. The first segment built was along Sugarland Road near Dawsonville. The concrete road was built from MD 28 south to near Montevideo Road in 1923. The highway was extended south beyond Montevideo Road to near Dry Seneca Creek in 1929 and 1930. Also in Dawsonville, a concrete road was built north from MD 28 along White Ground Road in 1933. The third segment was Schaeffer Road from MD 117 south to near the Maryland SoccerPlex; that highway consisted of macadam and concrete segments built in 1929 and 1930. By 1939, the state highways along Sugarland Road, White Ground Road, and Schaeffer Road were all part of MD 119, a number now used for Great Seneca Highway through Rockville, Gaithersburg, and Germantown. In 1952, White Ground Road and Schaeffer Road were designated MD 121. The following year, Sugarland Road became MD 121 as well. Thus, in 1953, there were four separate portions of MD 121. In 1956, MD 121 along Sugarland Road was transferred to county maintenance. That same year, Schaeffer Road became MD 119 again for a short time until it was turned over to Montgomery County in 1958. The 1.00-mile (1.61 km) segment of MD 121 along White Ground Road was transferred to county maintenance in 1999 as part of a highway swap to designate Great Seneca Highway as MD 119 (which ironically, was the original number for White Ground Road).

== Junction list ==
The entire route is in Montgomery County.

Location	mi	km	Destinations	Notes
Boyds	0.00	0.00	MD 117 (Barnesville Road/Clarksburg Road) to MD 28 – Barnesville, Germantown	Southern terminus
Clarksburg	3.83	6.16	I-270 (Eisenhower Memorial Highway) – Frederick, Washington	I-270 Exit 18
Clarksburg	3.96	6.37	Stringtown Road north to MD 355 – Hyattstown, Germantown	Northern terminus
1.000 mi = 1.609 km; 1.000 km = 0.621 mi

== Auxiliary route ==
MD 121A (signed as MD 121) is the designation for the 0.46-mile (0.74 km) segment of two-lane undivided Clarksburg Road that is disconnected from the mainline of MD 121. The highway begins at a cul-de-sac adjacent to MD 121's northern terminus just north of its I-270 interchange. Just north of the cul-de-sac, MD 121A meets the western end of Gateway Center Drive, which links the route with Stringtown Road. The highway continues north to MD 355 (Frederick Road) in Clarksburg, an intersection from which Clarksburg Road continues north as a county highway. MD 121A was assigned in 2007 when MD 121 was cut in two by the construction of Stringtown Road by Montgomery County.
