= Maryland Route 119 =

State highway in Montgomery County, Maryland, US, known as Great Seneca Hwy

Maryland Route 119
- Great Seneca Highway
- Maryland Route 119 highlighted in red

Route information
- Maintained by MDSHA
- Length: 7.47 mi (12.02 km)
- Existed: 1999–present

Major junctions
- South end: MD 28 in Rockville
- MD 124 in Gaithersburg; MD 117 in Germantown
- North end: Middlebrook Road in Germantown

Location
- Country: United States
- State: Maryland
- Counties: Montgomery

Highway system
- Maryland highway system; Interstate; US; State; Scenic Byways
← MD 118	→ MD 121

Maryland Route 119 (MD 119) is a state highway in the U.S. state of Maryland. Also known as Great Seneca Highway, the highway runs 7.47 miles (12.02 km) from MD 28 in Rockville north to Middlebrook Road in Germantown. MD 119 is a four- to six-lane divided highway that connects several residential and commercial neighborhoods in Rockville, Gaithersburg, and Germantown. Great Seneca Highway was planned by Montgomery County in the late 1960s as a local relief route for traffic on parallel Interstate 270 (I-270) between the three communities. By the early 1980s, the highway had become controversial because it was proposed to pass through Seneca Creek State Park. A coalition of civic and environmental groups unsuccessfully pursued litigation to stop the highway. The National Park Service refused permission for the county to build the highway in 1985 but reversed itself two years later, by which time the first segment of the highway in Germantown was nearing completion. The Rockville–Gaithersburg section was completed in 1989 and the controversial segment through the state park was finished in 1990. Almost all of Great Seneca Highway became MD 119 in 1999.

== Route description ==
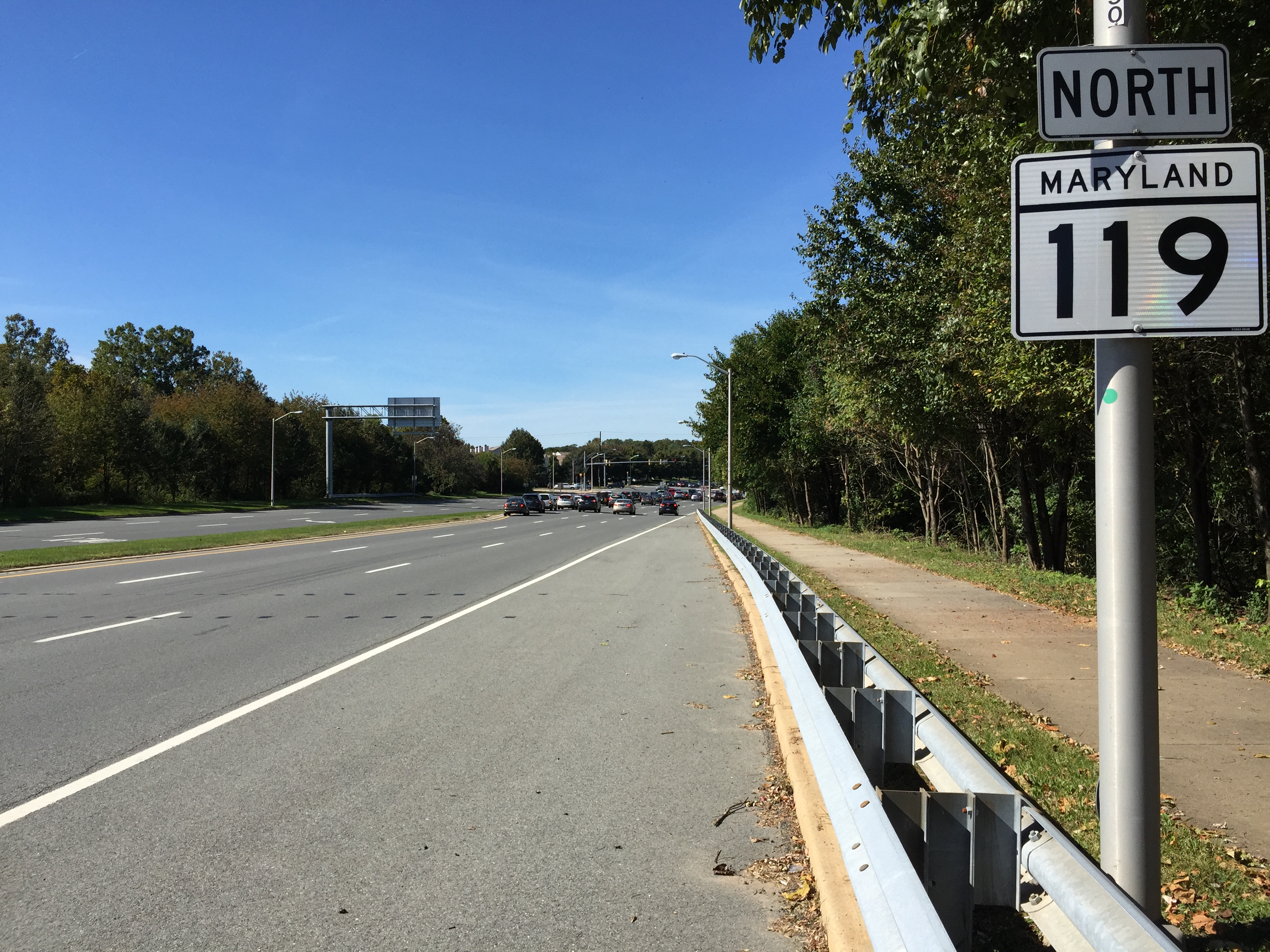
View north along MD 119 in Gaithersburg

MD 119 begins at an intersection with MD 28 (Key West Avenue) in an unincorporated area west of the city of Rockville. Great Seneca Highway continues south as a county highway to Darnestown Road and provides access to Shady Grove Adventist Hospital, the Universities at Shady Grove, and the former Montgomery County campus of Johns Hopkins University. MD 119 heads northwest as a four-lane divided highway. The highway crosses over Shady Branch twice around its intersection with Sam Eig Highway, a county highway that connects MD 119 with I-370, I-270, MD 200, and the Shady Grove station along Washington Metro's Red Line. At the county highway, MD 119 enters the city of Gaithersburg and temporarily expands to six lanes until its intersection with Muddy Branch Road. The highway crosses Muddy Branch and passes along the edge of the New Urbanist community of Kentlands before intersecting MD 124 (Quince Orchard Road).

MD 119 leaves the city of Gaithersburg and passes through Seneca Creek State Park. The highway does not provide access to the state park; the only park road the highway meets, Deer Ridge Road, passes over the state highway. Within the park, MD 119 crosses Long Draught Branch and Great Seneca Creek. On the western edge of the park, the state highway passes northeast of a Washington Suburban Sanitary Commission water treatment facility and enters the unincorporated suburb of Germantown. MD 119 curves north as it intersects Richter Farm Road and passes east of Northwest High School. The highway crosses Gunners Branch and intersects MD 117 (Clopper Road). MD 119 curves northeast to cross CSX's Metropolitan Subdivision railroad line, which carries MARC's Brunswick Line. The highway curves back north and intersects Wisteria Drive before reaching its northern terminus at Middlebrook Road east of Seneca Valley High School. Middlebrook Road is a county highway that provides access to MD 118 and the Germantown MARC station to the west and I-270 and MD 355 to the east.

MD 119 is a part of the National Highway System as a principal arterial for its entire length.

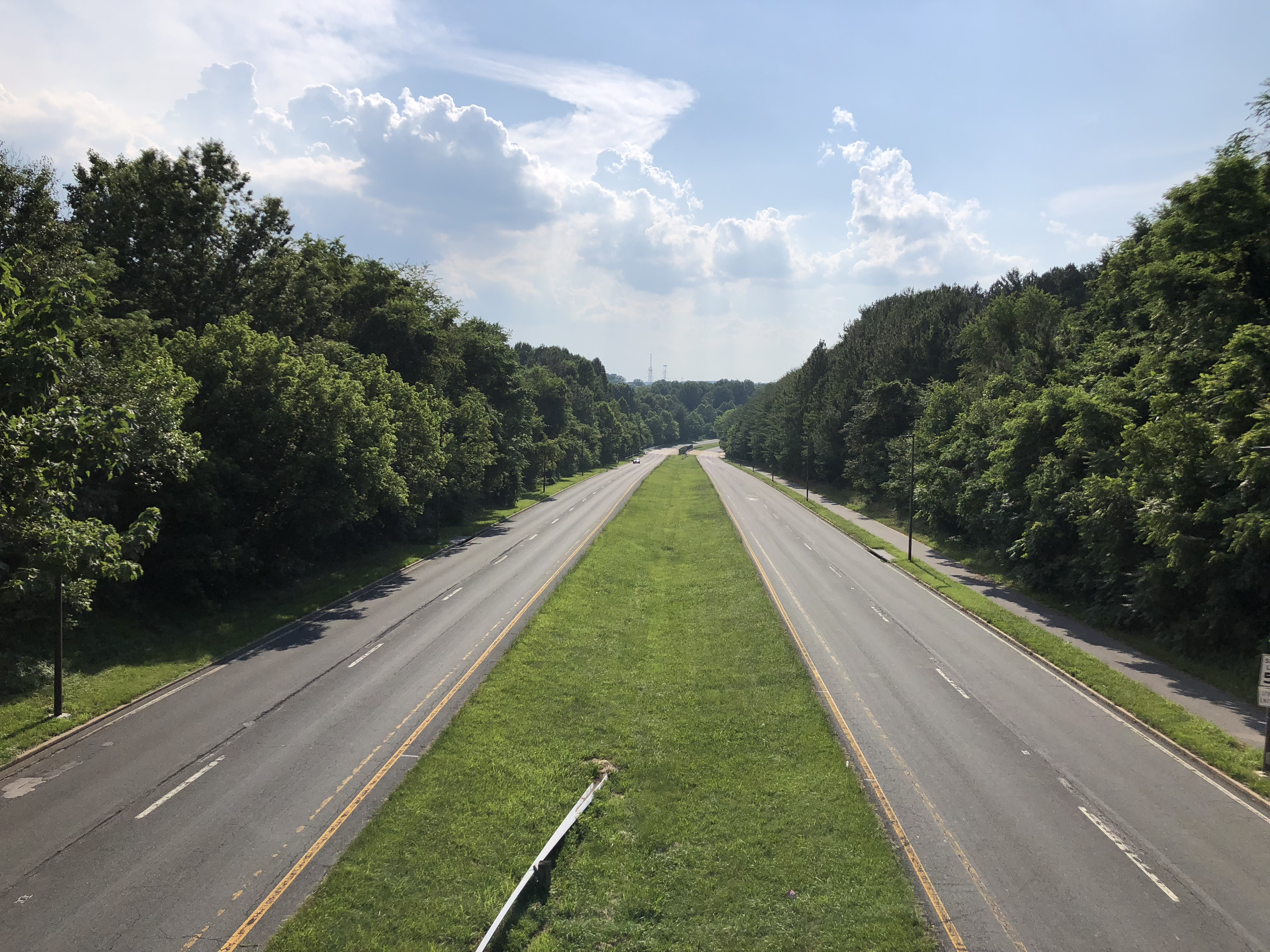
MD 119 northbound through Seneca Creek State Park

== History ==
Great Seneca Highway was proposed by Montgomery County in the late 1960s to relieve congestion along the I-270 corridor and provide a crucial link between Germantown and Rockville. By the early 1980s, a coalition of civic and environmental groups came together to oppose construction of Great Seneca Highway through Seneca Creek State Park, which was part of a 6,000-acre (2,400 ha) nature preserve along the corridor of Great Seneca Creek. Montgomery County approved the route through the park on its master plan in 1976. Despite less disruptive alternate routes being identified, the county chose to advance the routing that would be most disruptive to the state park when it put together the project's environmental impact statement in 1983. The civic and environmental groups filed a lawsuit aiming to block construction of the highway in 1984. The groups achieved a victory in July 1985 when the National Park Service rejected Montgomery County's proposed routing for the highway in favor of widening existing routes through the nature preserve.

However, in June 1987, the National Park Service reversed its ruling after Montgomery County agreed to build noise barriers and wildlife crossings and purchase land to compensate for the woods lost to construction of the highway. By this time, parts of the highway were under construction in Rockville and Germantown. The first segment of the highway, from Middlebrook Road south to MD 117, opened in August 1987. The second segment to open was from Darnestown Road, then part of MD 28, north to MD 124; this southern segment was open by April 1989. The coalition of civic and environmental groups filed another lawsuit in March 1988 seeking to block construction of the middle segment from MD 124 to MD 117, but the lawsuit was dismissed on appeal in April 1989. Montgomery County began construction on the middle section in 1988 while the lawsuit was working its way through the courts because they were confident of prevailing. Great Seneca Highway fully opened when the middle section was completed in June 1990. In 1999, Great Seneca Highway north of MD 28 was designated MD 119 as part of a state–county maintenance swap in which 22 state highways were transferred to Montgomery County maintenance.

== Junction list ==
The entire route is in Montgomery County.

Location	mi	km	Destinations	Notes
Rockville	0.00	0.00	MD 28 (Key West Avenue) / Great Seneca Highway south – Darnestown	Southern terminus
Gaithersburg	0.51	0.82	Sam Eig Highway east to I-270 / I-370 – Metro Station	Western terminus of Sam Eig Highway
Gaithersburg	2.57	4.14	MD 124 (Quince Orchard Road) – Darnestown, Montgomery Village	
Germantown	6.04	9.72	MD 117 (Clopper Road) – Gaithersburg, Boyds	
Germantown	7.47	12.02	Middlebrook Road to MD 118 / I-270 / MD 355 – MARC Station	Northern terminus
1.000 mi = 1.609 km; 1.000 km = 0.621 mi
