= Dwight D. Eisenhower Highway (Maryland) =

Dwight D. Eisenhower Highway (Maryland) can refer to:

- Interstate 70 from Pennsylvania state line to Interstate 270
  - Interstate 270 from Interstate 495 to Interstate 70
