= Maryland Route 28 =

State highway in Maryland, US

Maryland Route 28
- Maryland Route 28 highlighted in red

Route information
- Maintained by MDSHA
- Length: 37.38 mi (60.16 km)
- Existed: 1927–present
- Tourist routes: Chesapeake and Ohio Canal Scenic Byway; Antietam Campaign Scenic Byway

Major junctions
- West end: US 15 in Point of Rocks
- MD 85 at Tuscarora; MD 109 in Beallsville; MD 118 in Darnestown; MD 124 in Gaithersburg; MD 119 in Rockville; I-270 in Rockville; MD 355 in Rockville; MD 586 in Rockville; MD 115 at Norbeck; MD 97 at Norbeck
- East end: MD 182 near Norwood

Location
- Country: United States
- State: Maryland
- Counties: Frederick, Montgomery

Highway system
- Maryland highway system; Interstate; US; State; Scenic Byways
← MD 27	→ US 29

Maryland Route 28 (MD 28) is a state highway in the U.S. state of Maryland. The state highway runs 37.38 miles (60.16 km) from U.S. Route 15 (US 15) in Point of Rocks east to MD 182 in Norwood. The western portion of MD 28 is a rural highway connecting several villages in southern Frederick County and western Montgomery County. By contrast, the eastern portion of the state highway is a major east–west commuter route, particularly within Gaithersburg and Rockville.

MD 28 was an original 1927 Maryland state highway. The state highway originally extended north and east through Olney to Ashton, but the highway was rolled back to Norbeck in the 1940s. MD 28 was extended east to its present eastern terminus in the early 1980s. The original western terminus was in Tuscarora, but the state highway was extended to Point of Rocks around 1970. In addition to being expanded to a multi-lane divided highway in central Montgomery County beginning in the 1970s, MD 28 was relocated in downtown Rockville in the 1940s, in eastern Rockville in the 1970s, and in western Rockville in the 1990s.

== Route description ==
MD 28 follows portions of two Maryland Scenic Byways: the Chesapeake and Ohio Canal Scenic Byway from its western terminus in Point of Rocks to MD 109 in Beallsville and the Antietam Campaign Scenic Byway from MD 85 near Tuscarora to Mount Ephraim Road at Dickerson. The highway is also part of the National Highway System as a principal arterial from MD 112 in Darnestown to MD 182 in Norwood.

=== Point of Rocks to Darnestown ===
MD 28 begins at an intersection with US 15 (Catoctin Mountain Highway) in Point of Rocks, just north of the Point of Rocks Bridge that carries US 15 across the Potomac River. The state highway heads east as two-lane undivided Clay Street, which parallels CSX's Metropolitan Subdivision rail line and the linear Chesapeake and Ohio Canal National Historical Park through town. MD 28 passes north of the Point of Rocks station of MARC's Brunswick Line where CSX's Metropolitan Subdivision and the Old Main Line Subdivision meet at a wye. The state highway parallels and then crosses at-grade to the south side of the Old Main Line Subdivision at the east end of town. MD 28 continues east as Tuscarora Road, which crosses Washington Run and Tuscarora Creek. The highway passes through the hamlet of Tuscarora before reaching a three-way intersection with MD 85, which heads north as Buckeystown Pike. MD 28 turns southeast onto Dickerson Road.

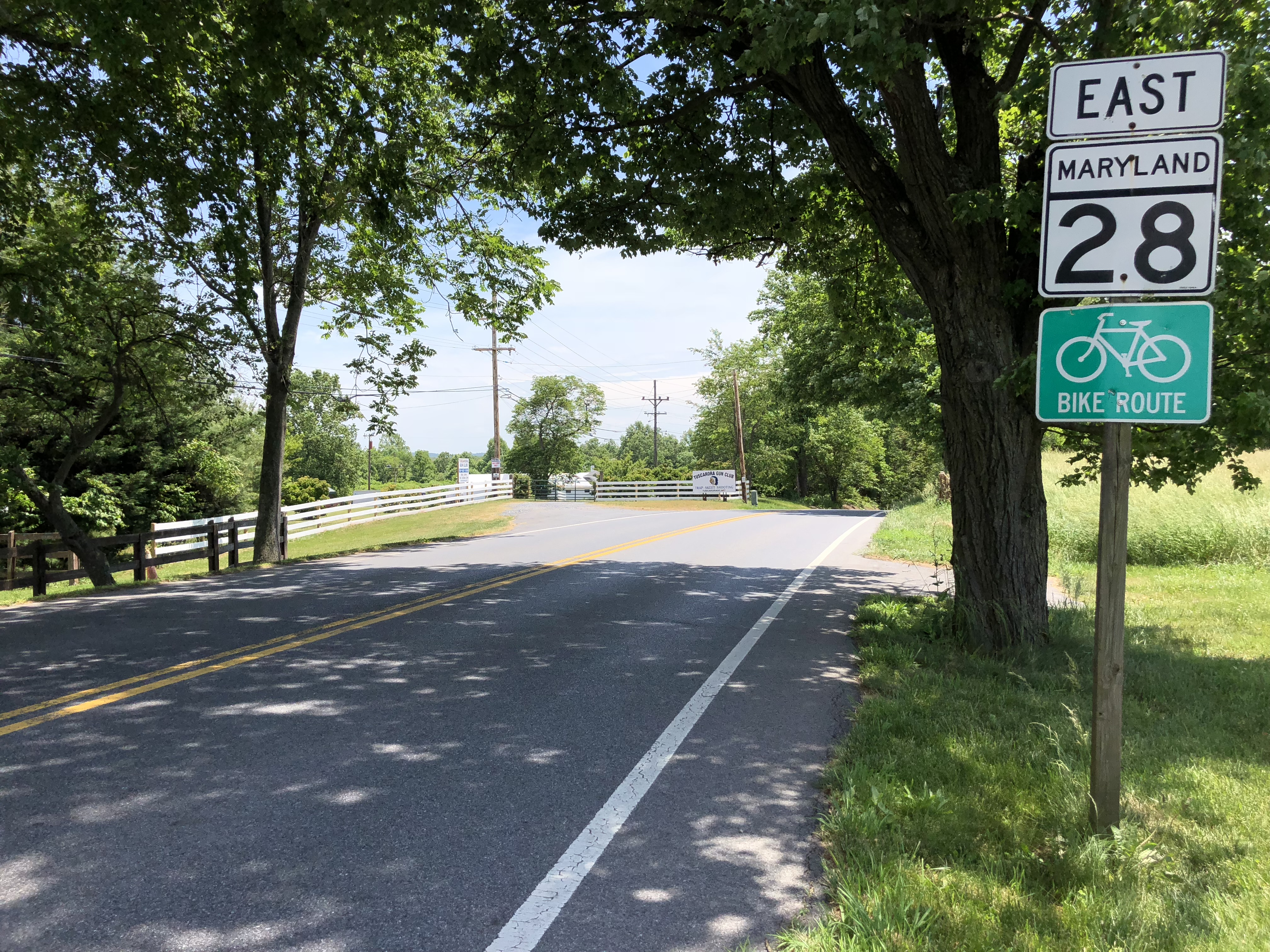
View east along MD 28 east of Point of Rocks

MD 28 heads southeast and crosses the Monocacy River at Furnace Ford shortly before entering Montgomery County. After intersecting Mouth of Monocacy Road, which heads west to the Monocacy Aqueduct, the state highway enters Dickerson, where the road meets Mt. Ephraim Road, which serves MARC's Dickerson station and continues northeast toward Sugarloaf Mountain. Immediately after Mt. Ephraim Road, MD 28 turns south and passes through a narrow underpass of the Metropolitan Subdivision rail line. MD 28 crosses the Little Monocacy River before the intersection with Martinsburg Road, which heads southwest toward the Dickerson Generating Station and White's Ferry.

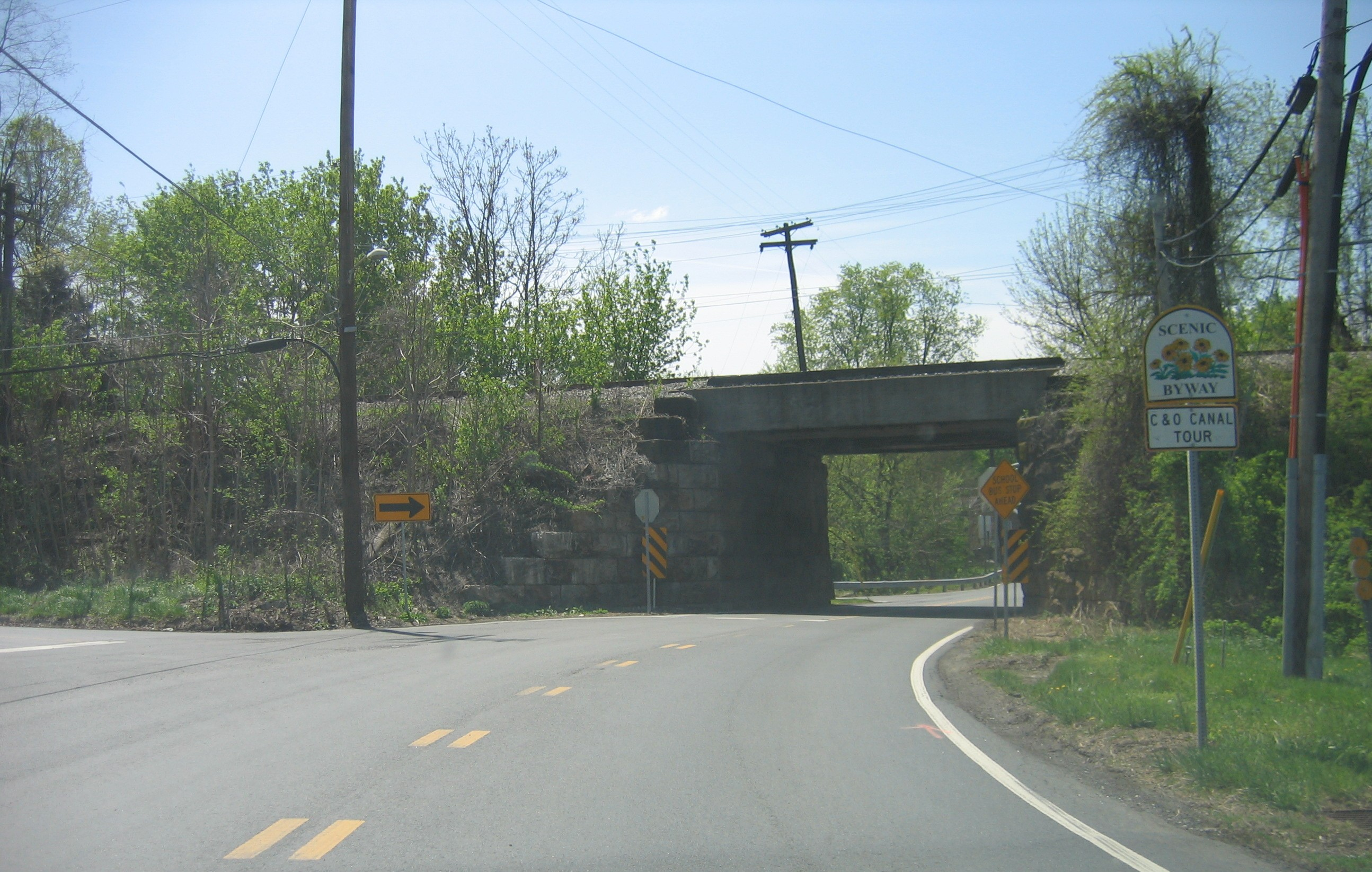
Intersection of MD 28 and Mt. Ephraim Road next to the underpass of CSX's Metropolitan Subdivision in Dickerson

MD 28 continues southeast as Darnestown Road toward Beallsville, where the highway intersects MD 109 (Beallsville Road), which serves Poolesville to the south. The highway passes south of the Darby Store at the latter intersection, then continues south of the Hanover Farm House at Four Streams Golf Club and crosses Dry Seneca Creek. After an oblique intersection with MD 117 (Bucklodge Road) at Lees Corner, the state highway enters Dawsonville, where it intersects White Ground Road, which heads north past the Susanna Farm, and meets the eastern end of MD 107 (Whites Ferry Road), which serves Poolesville and leads to White's Ferry. MD 28 crosses Seneca Creek and passes Seneca Creek State Park before entering Darnestown. Within Darnestown, the state highway intersects MD 118 (Germantown Road) and MD 112 (Seneca Road). East of MD 112, MD 28 curves northeast and expands to a four-lane divided highway before passing Quince Orchard High School and intersecting MD 124 (Quince Orchard Road) at the southwest corner of the city of Gaithersburg.

=== Gaithersburg to Norwood ===
MD 28 continues southeast along the southern edge of Gaithersburg and passes by the new urbanist development Kentlands. The highway crosses Muddy Branch parallel to a pair of spurs on the south designated MD 899 (American Way). After the state highway expands to six lanes and intersects Muddy Branch Road, the old alignment of MD 28, Darnestown Road, splits to the east and MD 28 veers northeast as Key West Avenue. The state highway intersects MD 119 (Great Seneca Highway); passes to the north of the Montgomery County campus of Johns Hopkins University, the Universities at Shady Grove, and Shady Grove Adventist Hospital, and enters the city of Rockville at its intersection with Shady Grove Road, where the highway's name changes to Montgomery Avenue. MD 28 curves south through the western part of Rockville and meets the western end of Gude Drive, which provides a bypass of downtown Rockville, and the eastern end of Darnestown Road. The highway curves east again and crosses Watts Branch within its seven-ramp partial cloverleaf interchange with Interstate 270 (Eisenhower Memorial Highway).

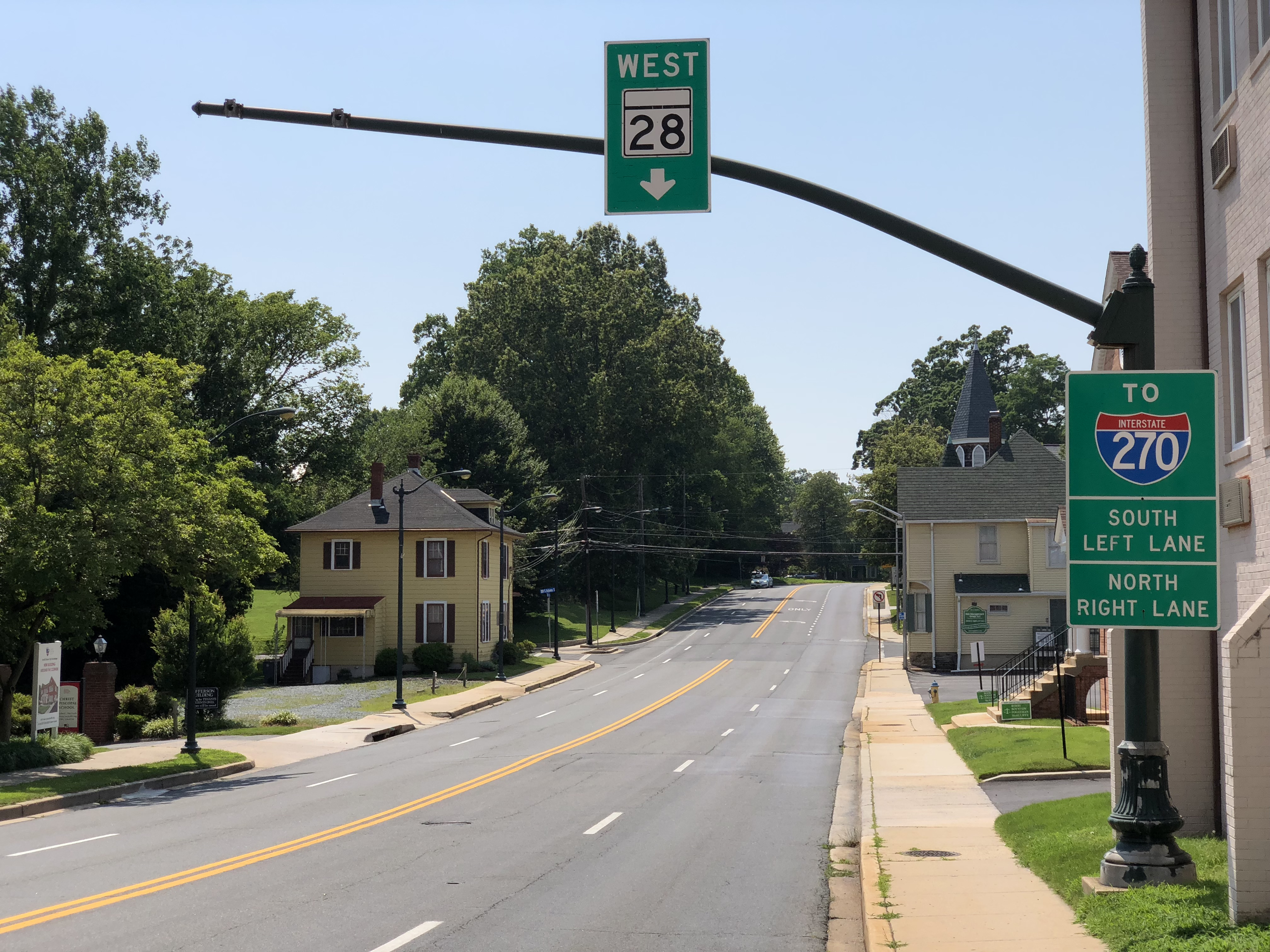
MD 28 westbound in downtown Rockville

MD 28 continues through the West Montgomery Avenue Historic District as a two-lane road with center turn lane. At Great Falls Road, near the Beall-Dawson House, the state highway veers southeast onto four-lane Jefferson Street through the Montgomery County Courthouse Historic District along the southern edge of downtown Rockville. MD 28 becomes a divided highway and its name changes to Veirs Mill Road at Monroe Street shortly before its oblique intersection with MD 355 (Rockville Pike) to the north of Richard Montgomery High School. Access from eastbound MD 28 to northbound MD 355 is provided via Monroe Street; the movement from westbound MD 28 to southbound MD 355 can be made via MD 660 (Dodge Street). After MD 28 crosses the Metropolitan Subdivision rail line and the Red Line of the Washington Metro, ramps to Stonestreet Avenue join eastbound and leave westbound to provide access to the Rockville station serving Metro, MARC, and Amtrak trains. East of the Stonestreet ramps, the state highway has a four-way intersection with MD 586 (Veirs Mill Road) and MD 911 (First Street); the latter route provides another connection between MD 355 and both MD 28 and MD 586.

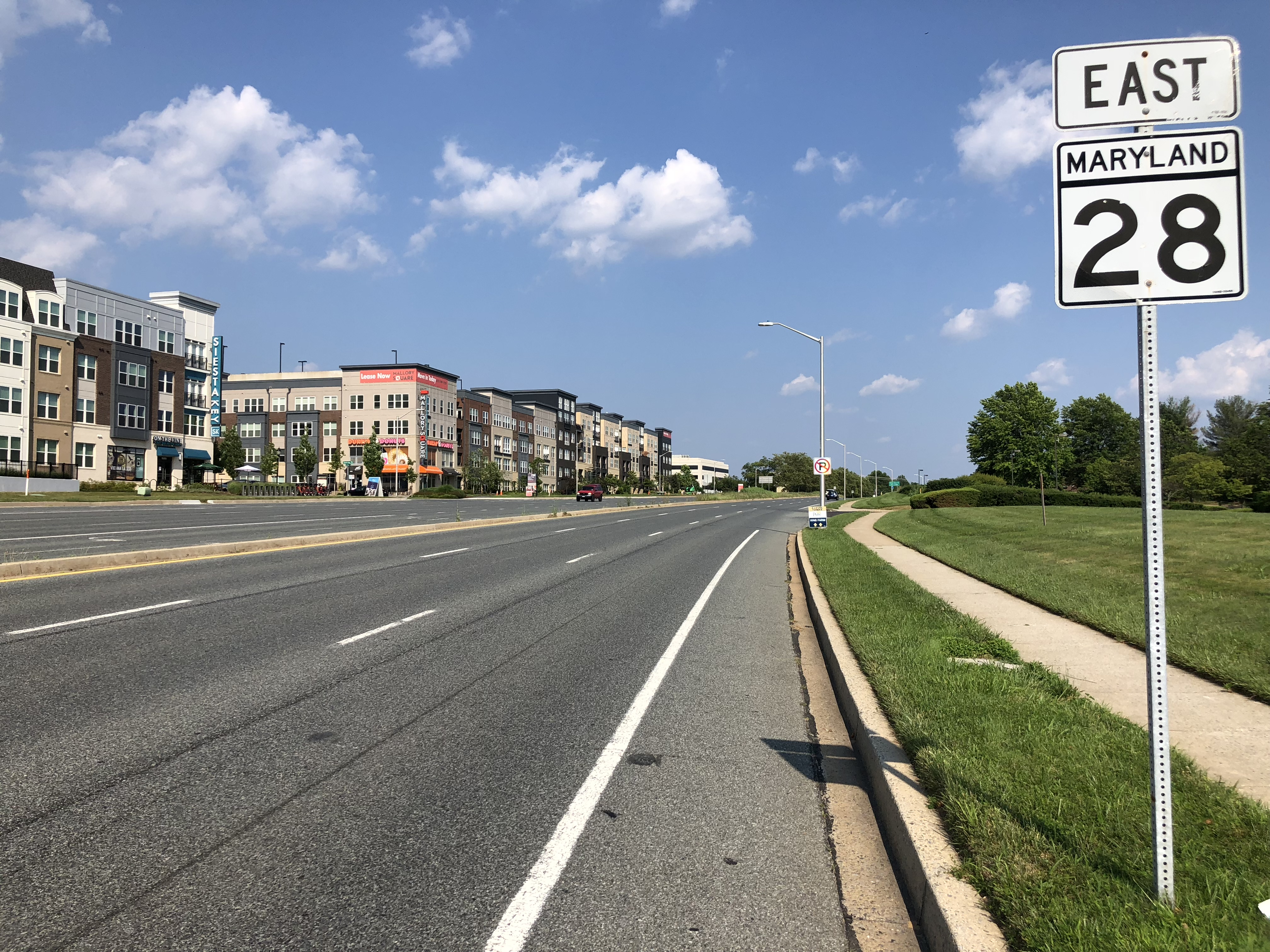
MD 28 eastbound in Rockville

MD 28 continues north along four-lane divided First Street. North of Baltimore Road, First Street continues straight while the state highway veers to the northeast as Norbeck Road. MD 28 intersects the eastern end of Gude Drive, leaves the city of Rockville at its crossing of Rock Creek, and meets the other end of Baltimore Road. The state highway continues east, flanked along most of the way by service roads, many of which are part of MD 655 (Old MD 28). After intersecting MD 115 (Muncaster Mill Road), MD 28 meets MD 97 (Georgia Avenue) in the unincorporated community of Norbeck. The highway heads southeast of a park and ride lot that is accessed from MD 928 before it reduces to a two-lane road and runs along the northern edge of Leisure World. The state highway crosses over MD 200 (Intercounty Connector) with no access immediately to the west of Wintergate Drive, where it crosses the ICC Trail. After crossing Batchellors Run, MD 28 expands to a four-lane divided highway for its terminating intersection with MD 182 (Layhill Road) near Norwood. Norbeck Road continues east as a county-maintained highway toward the intersection of MD 650 and MD 198 near Spencerville.

== History ==
Maryland Route 609
- Location: Norbeck–Norwood
- Existed: 1935–1981

MD 28 is one of the original Maryland state-numbered highways assigned in 1927. The highway's original western terminus was at Tuscarora, from which US 15 headed west toward Point of Rocks and north toward Frederick. MD 28 was extended west to Point of Rocks when US 15 was moved to its present course between Point of Rocks and Frederick in 1970. The state highway's original eastern terminus was at the original MD 27 in Ashton. MD 27 later became US 29; today, this is the intersection of MD 108 and MD 650. MD 28 followed MD 97 from Norbeck north to Olney, then used what is now MD 108 from Olney east to Ashton. MD 28 was truncated to Norbeck by 1946. The highway was extended from Norbeck to its present eastern terminus near Norwood, replacing what had been MD 609, in 1981.

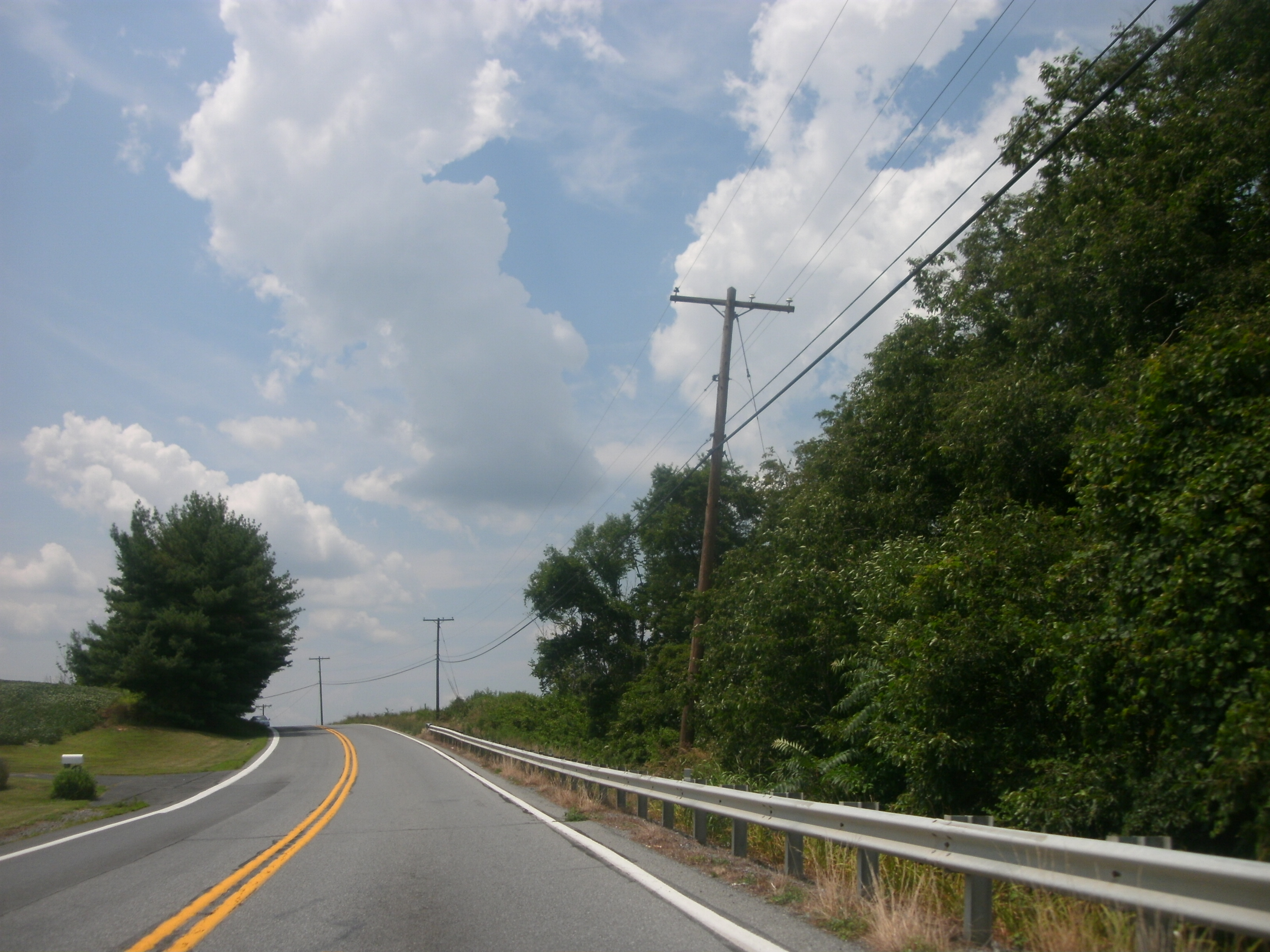
MD 28 westbound near the village of Tuscarora

MD 28 originally followed Baltimore Road between downtown Rockville and east of Rock Creek. Between 1940 and 1944, MD 28 was placed on a new grade-separated crossing of the Metropolitan Branch along Veirs Mill Road, then north on First Street to Baltimore Road. MD 28 was rolled back from Ashton to Norbeck between 1944 and 1946. In 1969 or 1970, the controlled access portion of US 15 north of Point of Rocks was completed. As a result, MD 85 was assigned to the old route of US 15 north of Tuscarora and MD 28 was extended west to its current terminus in Point of Rocks. Also in 1970, the bypass of Baltimore Road in eastern Rockville was under construction. In 1981, MD 28 was made a divided highway between downtown Rockville and Baltimore Avenue west of Rock Creek. In 1982, the divided highway was extended from Baltimore Avenue east of Rock Creek to MD 97.

In the mid 1990s, Key West Avenue in the western part of Rockville was completed and expanded to a six-lane divided highway. MD 28 was moved to the improved highway to bypass the parallel stretch of Darnestown Road by 1999. Between 2002 and 2004, MD 28 was widened to a four- to six-lane divided highway between MD 124 and the west end of Key West Avenue. In 2002, Norbeck Road was completed between the eastern terminus of MD 28 and the MD 650-MD 198 intersection.

== Junction list ==
County	Location	mi	km	Destinations	Notes
Frederick	Point of Rocks	0.00	0.00	US 15 (Catoctin Mountain Highway) – Frederick, Leesburg	Western terminus
Frederick	Tuscarora	4.73	7.61	MD 85 north (Buckeystown Pike) – Buckeystown	Southern terminus of MD 85
Montgomery	Beallsville	11.85	19.07	MD 109 (Beallsville Road) – Poolesville, Barnesville	
Montgomery	Dawsonville	15.43	24.83	MD 117 east (Bucklodge Road) – Boyds	Western terminus of MD 117
Montgomery	Dawsonville	17.31	27.86	MD 107 west (Whites Ferry Road) – Poolesville, White's Ferry	Eastern terminus of MD 107
Montgomery	Darnestown	19.93	32.07	MD 118 north (Germantown Road) – Germantown	Southern terminus of MD 118
Montgomery	Darnestown	20.68	33.28	MD 112 west (Seneca Road) – Seneca	Eastern terminus of MD 112
Montgomery	Gaithersburg	23.20	37.34	MD 124 north (Quince Orchard Road) – Montgomery Village	Southern terminus of MD 124
Montgomery	Rockville	26.12	42.04	MD 119 north (Great Seneca Highway) – Gaithersburg	Southern terminus of MD 119
Montgomery	Rockville	28.65	46.11	I-270 (Eisenhower Memorial Highway) – Frederick, Washington	I-270 Exit 6
Montgomery	Rockville	30.22	48.63	MD 355 (Rockville Pike) – Gaithersburg, Bethesda	No direct access from eastbound MD 28 to northbound MD 355 or from westbound MD 28 to southbound MD 355
Montgomery	Rockville	30.33	48.81	Dodge Street	Unsigned MD 660
Montgomery	Rockville	30.55	49.17	Stonestreet Avenue north	Westbound exit, eastbound entrance
Montgomery	Rockville	30.65	49.33	MD 586 east (Veirs Mill Road) / MD 911 south (First Street) – Wheaton, North Bethesda	Western terminus of MD 586; northern terminus of MD 911; MD 28 turns north at this intersection
Montgomery	Norbeck	34.59	55.67	MD 115 (Muncaster Mill Road) – Redland	
Montgomery	Norbeck	34.81	56.02	MD 97 (Georgia Avenue) to MD 200 Toll – Olney, Washington	
Montgomery	Norwood	37.38	60.16	MD 182 (Layhill Road) / Norbeck Road east to MD 198 east – Glenmont, Sandy Spring, Spencerville	Eastern terminus
1.000 mi = 1.609 km; 1.000 km = 0.621 mi: Incomplete access
