= Interstate 270 (Maryland) =

Highway in Maryland

Interstate 270
- Dwight D. Eisenhower Highway; Washington National Pike
- I-270 highlighted in red; I-270 Spur in blue

Route information
- Auxiliary route of I-70
- Maintained by MDSHA
- Length: 34.70 mi (55.84 km) 32.60 mi (52.46 km) mainline 2.10 mi (3.38 km) spur
- Existed: 1975–present
- NHS: Entire route

Major junctions
- South end: I-495 / MD 355 in Bethesda
- MD 28 in Rockville; I-370 in Gaithersburg
- North end: I-70 / US 40 in Frederick

Location
- Country: United States
- State: Maryland
- Counties: Montgomery, Frederick

Highway system
- Interstate Highway System; Main; Auxiliary; Suffixed; Business; Future; Maryland highway system; Interstate; US; State; Scenic Byways
← MD 268	→ MD 270

Interstate 270 (I-270) is a 34.7-mile (55.8 km) auxiliary Interstate Highway in the U.S. state of Maryland that travels from I-495 (Capital Beltway) just north of Bethesda in Montgomery County north to I-70 in the city of Frederick in Frederick County. It consists of the 32.6-mile (52.5 km) mainline as well as a 2.1-mile (3.4 km) spur that provides access to and from southbound I-495. I-270 is known as the Washington National Pike, and makes up the easternmost stretch of the Dwight D. Eisenhower Highway. Most of the southern part of the route in Montgomery County passes through suburban areas around Rockville and Gaithersburg that are home to many biotech firms. This portion of I-270 is up to 12 lanes wide and consists of a local–express lane configuration as well as high-occupancy vehicle lanes (HOV lanes) that are in operation during peak travel times. North of the Gaithersburg area, the road continues through the northern part of Montgomery County, passing Germantown and Clarksburg as a six- to eight-lane highway with an HOV lane in the northbound direction only. North of here, I-270 continues through rural areas into Frederick County and toward the city of Frederick as a four-lane freeway.

The freeway was built between 1953 and 1960 as the Washington National Pike between Bethesda and Frederick and carried U.S. Route 240 (US 240), which was rerouted off what is now Maryland Route 355 (MD 355) between these two points. With the creation of the Interstate Highway System a few years later, the road was designated as I-70S along with US 240. There were plans to extend I-70S to I-95 in Washington, D.C., on the North Central Freeway from the Capital Beltway; however, they were canceled in the 1970s due to opposition from residents in the freeway's path. The concurrent US 240 designation was removed in 1972 and I-70S became I-270 in 1975. Increasing traffic levels led to a $200-million (equivalent to $509 million in 2024) widening of the road in Montgomery County to its current configuration. Many improvements are slated for I-270, including the widening of the route that would add high-occupancy toll lanes (HOT lanes).

== Route description ==
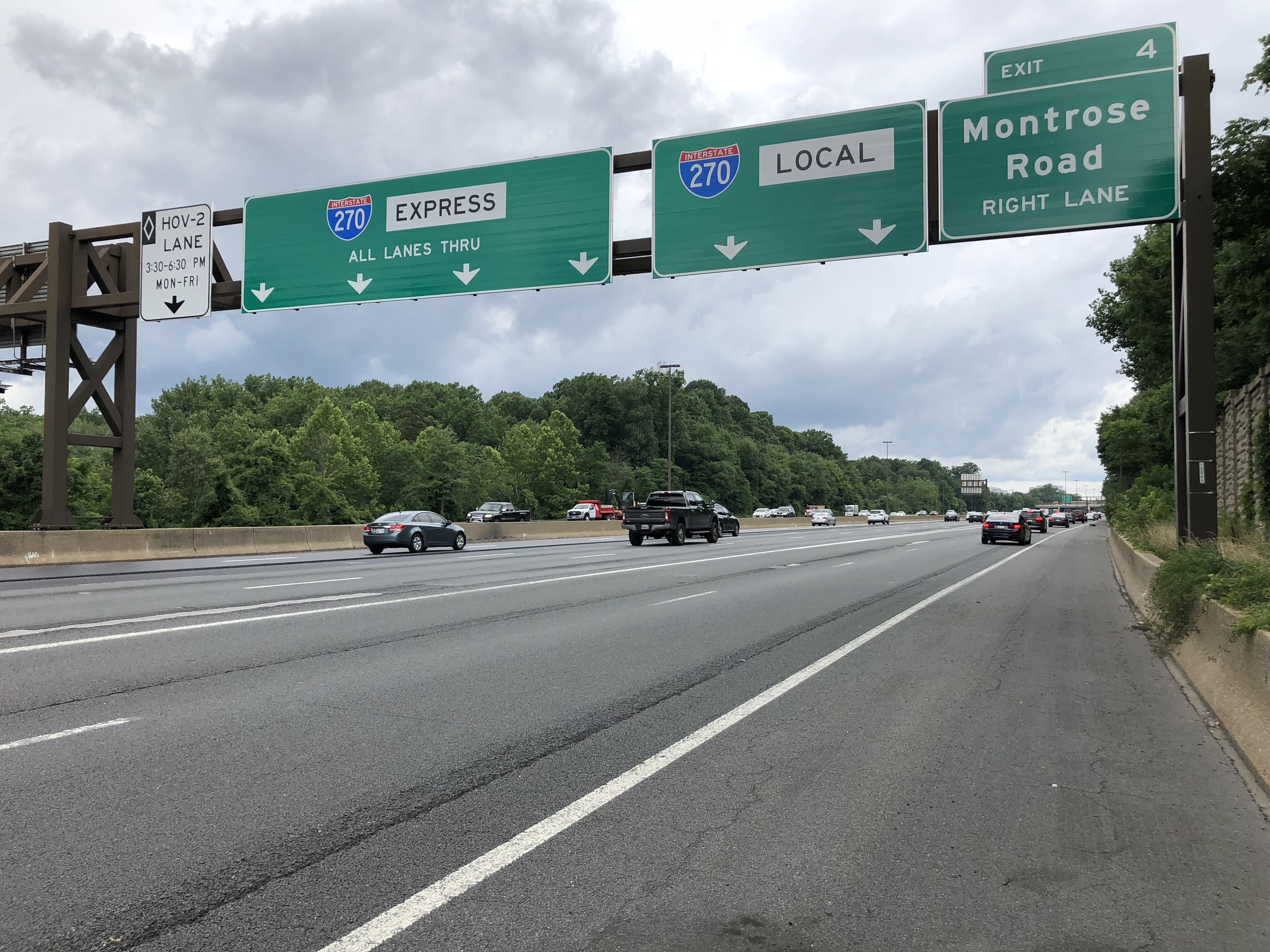
I-270 northbound near the exit for Montrose Road in North Bethesda

I-270 heads northwest from an interchange with I-495 (Capital Beltway) and MD 355 (Rockville Pike) in suburban Bethesda, Montgomery County, as a six-lane freeway. The left lane on each side is used as an HOV lane for carpools with two or more people in the northbound direction between 3:30 and 6:30 pm on weekdays and in the southbound direction between 6:00 and 9:00 am on weekdays. At the southern terminus, I-270 only has access to and from the eastbound direction of I-495. The road turns west and comes to an interchange with MD 187 (Old Georgetown Road) and Rockledge Drive (unsigned MD 187B). From there, I-270 continues west as a 10-lane freeway and merges with I-270 Spur, which provides access to and from southbound I-495. Past this interchange, I-270 continues north as a 12-lane freeway with an HOV lane and five travel lanes in each direction. The route passes through wooded suburban areas, where, prior to the cloverleaf interchange with Montrose Road (unsigned MD 927), I-270 takes on a local–express lane configuration with the outer two lanes serving as local lanes and the inner three lanes and the HOV lane serving as express lanes. Past Montrose Road, I-270 continues north into the Rockville area, turning northwest before it comes to a single-point urban interchange with MD 189 (Falls Road), where the highway sees 253,620 vehicles daily. The road continues to a modified cloverleaf interchange with MD 28 (Montgomery Avenue). Past MD 28, the freeway passes numerous business parks and some wooded areas before coming to an interchange with Shady Grove Road.

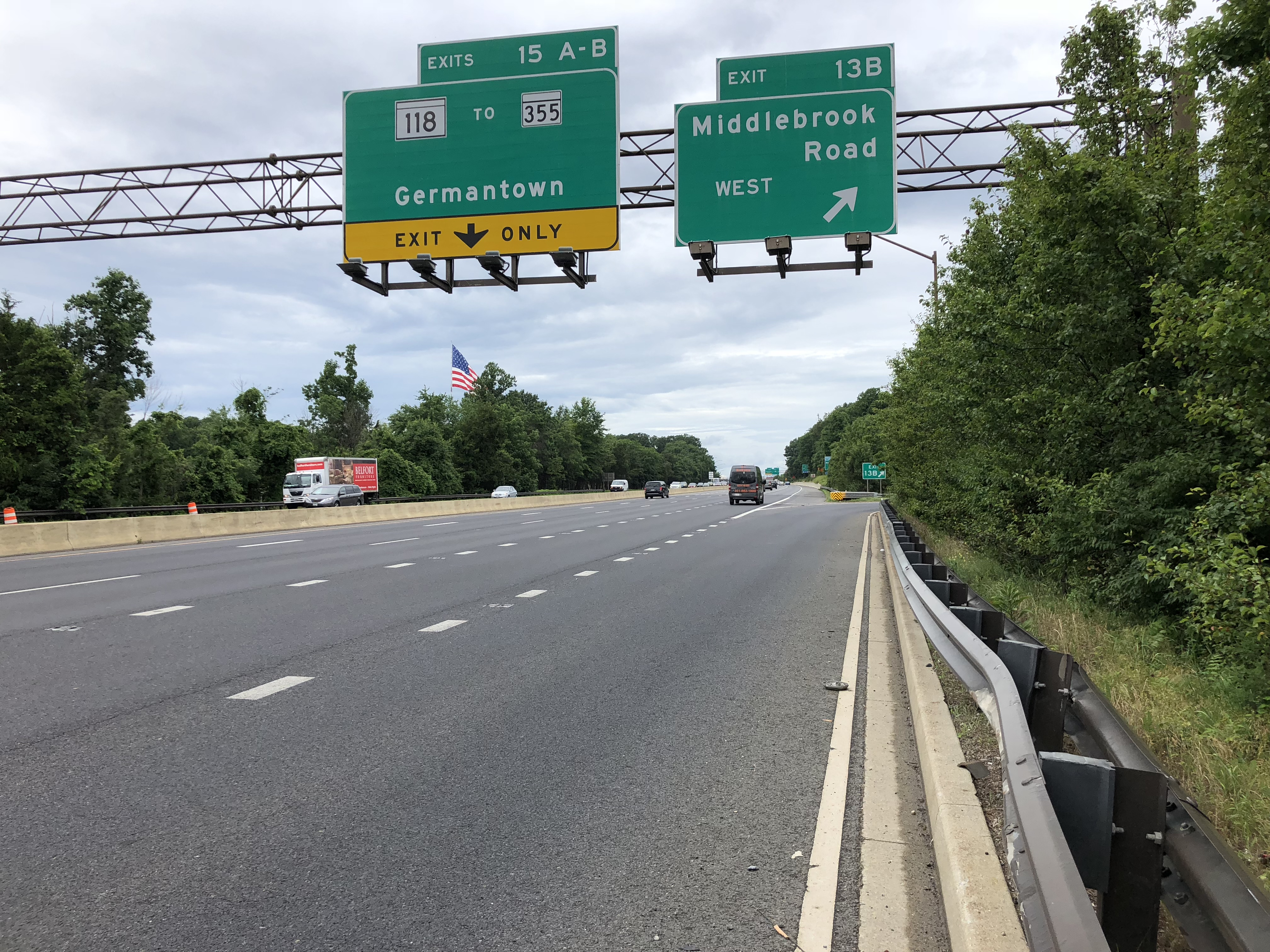
I-270 northbound at the Middlebrook Road exit in Germantown

Driving eastbound on Clopper Road from Firstfield Road in Gaithersburg before merging onto I-270 southbound towards Shady Grove Road in June 2026.

Past this interchange, I-270 leaves Rockville and heads into Gaithersburg, where it intersects I-370. This highway provides access to a park and ride lot at the Shady Grove station, which serves Washington Metro's Red Line, and MD 200 (Intercounty Connector), which heads east to I-95 in Laurel. Past I-370, the local lane configuration ends in the southbound direction, which now has an HOV lane and four travel lanes while the northbound direction still has an HOV lane, three express lanes, and two local lanes. I-270 continues past more suburban development before coming to a northbound exit and southbound entrance with MD 117 (West Diamond Avenue). Past this interchange, the southbound HOV restrictions end and I-270 continues north with four travel lanes in the southbound direction and an HOV lane, three express lanes, and two local lanes in the northbound direction before reaching MD 124 (Quince Orchard Road). Past MD 124, the northbound local lanes continue to the diamond interchange at Watkins Mill Road, after which they end. From there, I-270 heads northwest as an eight-lane freeway with four southbound lanes, an HOV lane, and three travel lanes northbound. It passes through wooded areas, leaving Gaithersburg and comes to an interchange with Middlebrook Road. The freeway narrows to six lanes again past at this interchange, with three lanes in each direction, including a northbound HOV lane. I-270 continues into the Germantown area and interchanges with MD 118 (Germantown Road). A short distance later, after passing by some business parks, I-270 comes to an interchange with MD 27 (Ridge Road) and Father Hurley Boulevard. Past MD 27, I-270 heads into more rural areas of woods with some farm fields, paralleled by a set of power lines. The road has an interchange with MD 121 (Clarksburg Road) in Clarksburg near the Clarksburg Premium Outlets, and the northbound HOV restriction ends past this interchange, with I-270 continuing north as a four-lane freeway. The power lines stop paralleling the route, and it continues through more rural areas of woods and farms, running closely parallel to MD 355. The median widens, with trees in the middle, and I-270 has weigh stations on both sides. The highway reaches Hyattstown, where it has an interchange with MD 109 (Old Hundred Road).

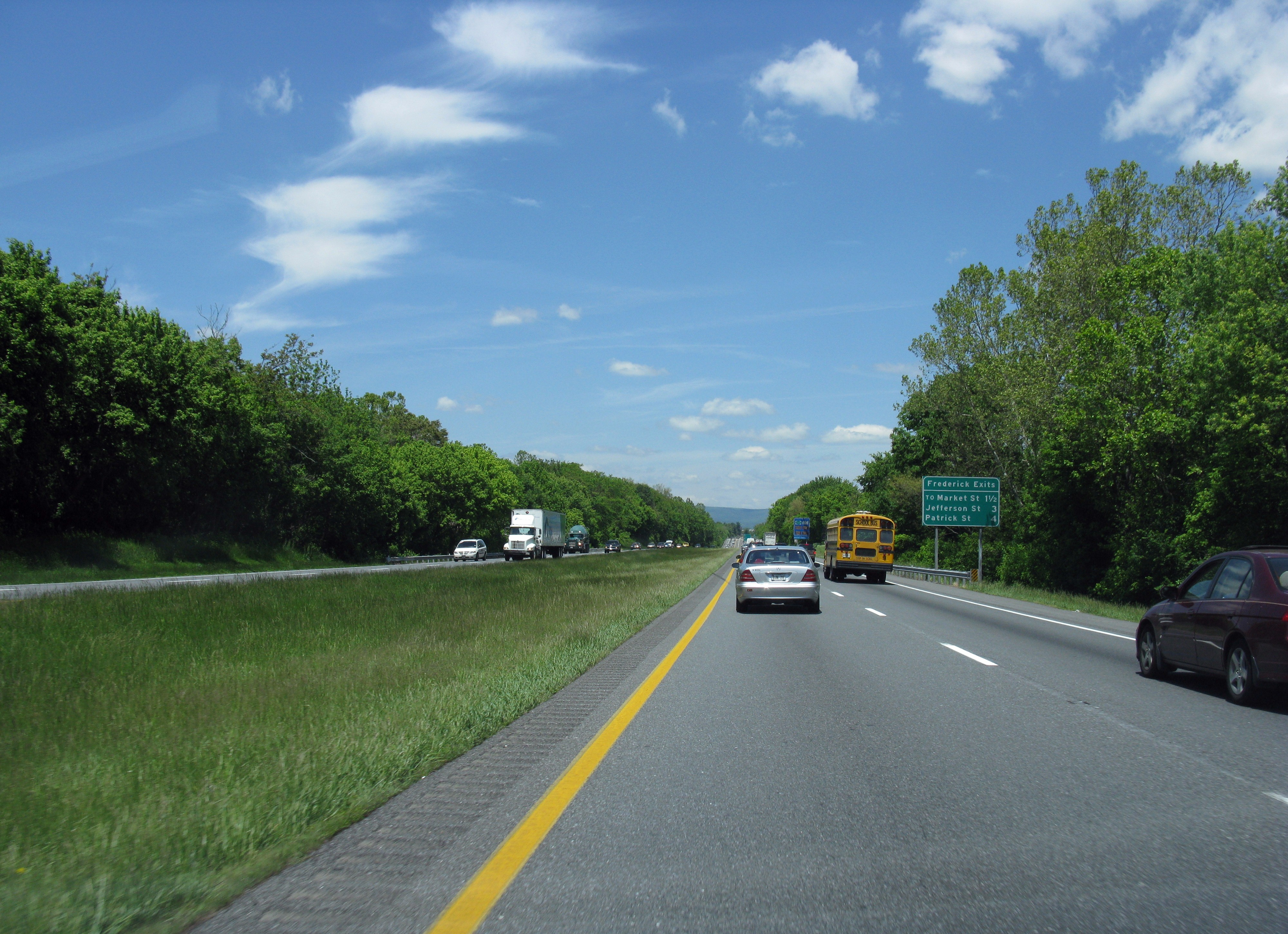
I-270 northbound approaching Frederick

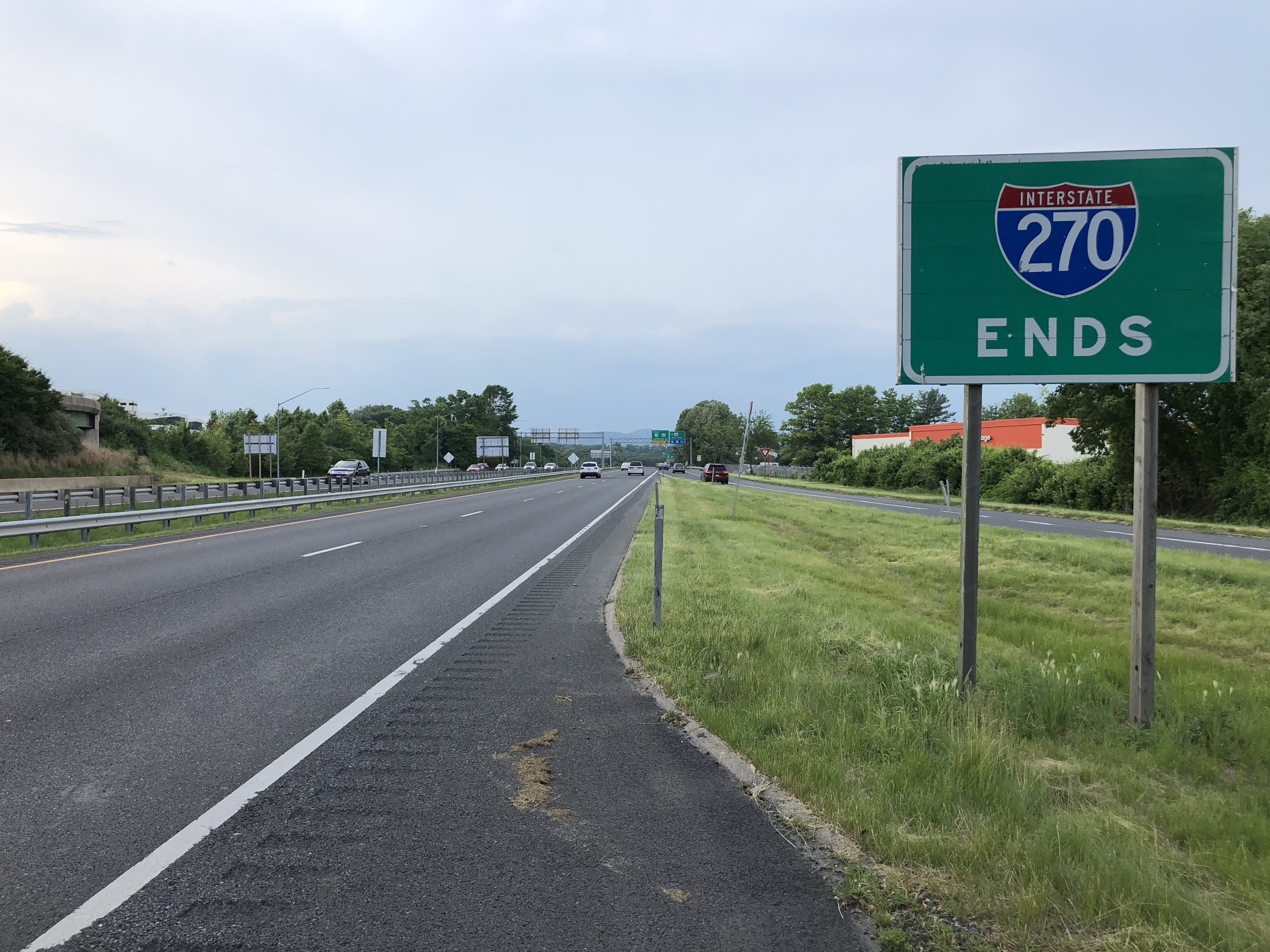
Northern terminus of I-270 in Frederick

A short distance past the MD 109 interchange, I-270 crosses into Frederick County, continuing northwest through rural woodland and farmland. It reaches the Urbana area, where the route has an interchange with MD 80 (Fingerboard Road). The highway briefly runs along the east side of MD 80 past this interchange before continuing through agricultural areas. It features a scenic overlook in the northbound direction as the road passes through Monocacy National Battlefield, which was the site of the Battle of Monocacy. I-270 eventually leaves the battlefield area and continues into the commercial outskirts of Frederick. Here, the road reaches an interchange with MD 85 (Buckeystown Pike) near the Francis Scott Key Mall. I-270 continues through commercial areas before coming to its northern terminus at an interchange with I-70 and US 40 (Baltimore National Pike). Past this interchange, the freeway continues north as the Frederick Freeway, a part of US 40 that interchanges with US 15 and US 340 a short distance north of I-270’s northern terminus.

== History ==
Interstate 70S
- Location: Frederick–Bethesda
- Existed: 1959–1975

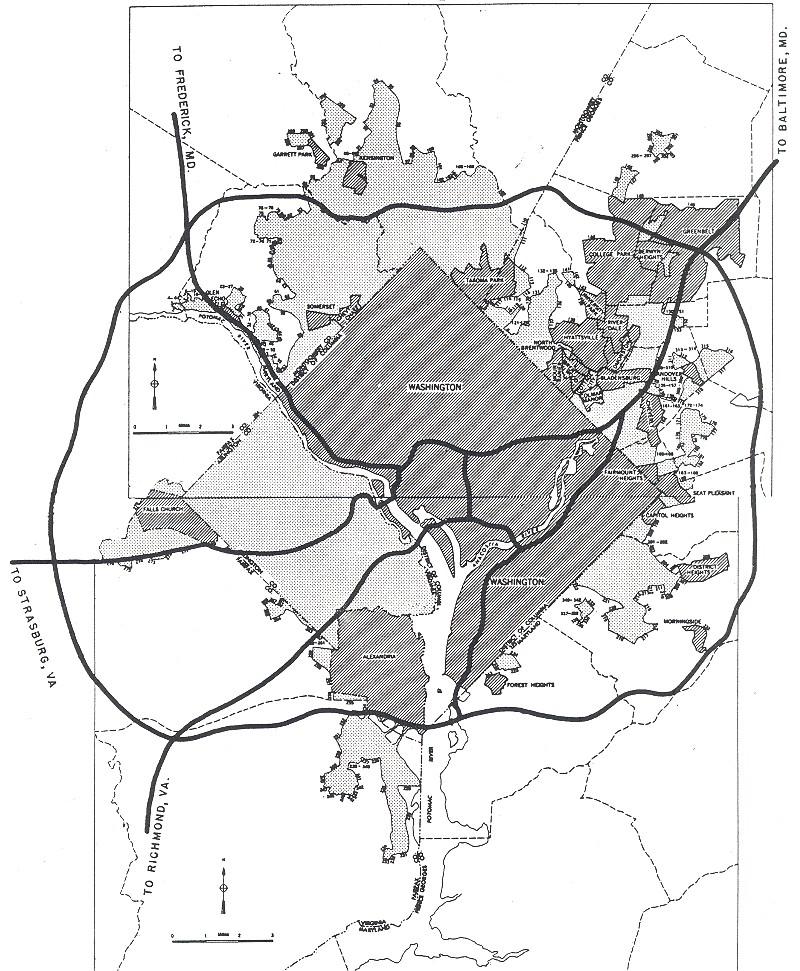
1955 Yellow Book map of Washington, D.C., showing a proposed Interstate Highway running to Frederick.

On November 20, 1944, the National Capital Park and Planning Commission (NCPC) announced plans to build a freeway through Montgomery County. The freeway would bypass Bethesda, Rockville, and Gaithersburg. Under one proposed route, the freeway would end at US 240 (present-day MD 355) north of Gaithersburg, while another proposal had the freeway continuing to Hagerstown. South of Bethesda, one proposal had the freeway connecting with Macarthur Boulevard in the District of Columbia, while another proposal had the freeway going around Cabin John and connect with Macarthur Boulevard in Maryland. Bethesda residents objected to the idea of a freeway running through residential areas. The NCPC agreed, and it approved the western route two years later. Further details about the routing were released in 1949, and construction began with the northern section in February 1950.

On January 25, 1953, the US 240 freeway was completed between Frederick to Urbana. The freeway's extension to Hyattstown opened on June 10, 1953. The extension to MD 118 in Germantown opened September 15, 1954.

A group of people opposed any highway in Rockville because of the perceived increase in traffic, and the group had threatened to form a human chain in the middle of the freeway, but they did not carry through with their threat. The freeway's extension to MD 28 in Rockville opened on May 18, 1956.

The Maryland State Roads Commission determined that a portion of Monroe Street in Rockville should be closed in order to avoid building a costly overpass to continue the road to the west side of the new freeway. The Montgomery County Council had opposed the idea, but it ultimately withdrew its opposition because the federal government had agreed to add and pay for a freeway interchange with Montrose Road, which had not been in the freeway's original plan. In 1956, the US 240 freeway was completed from US 15 north to US 40.

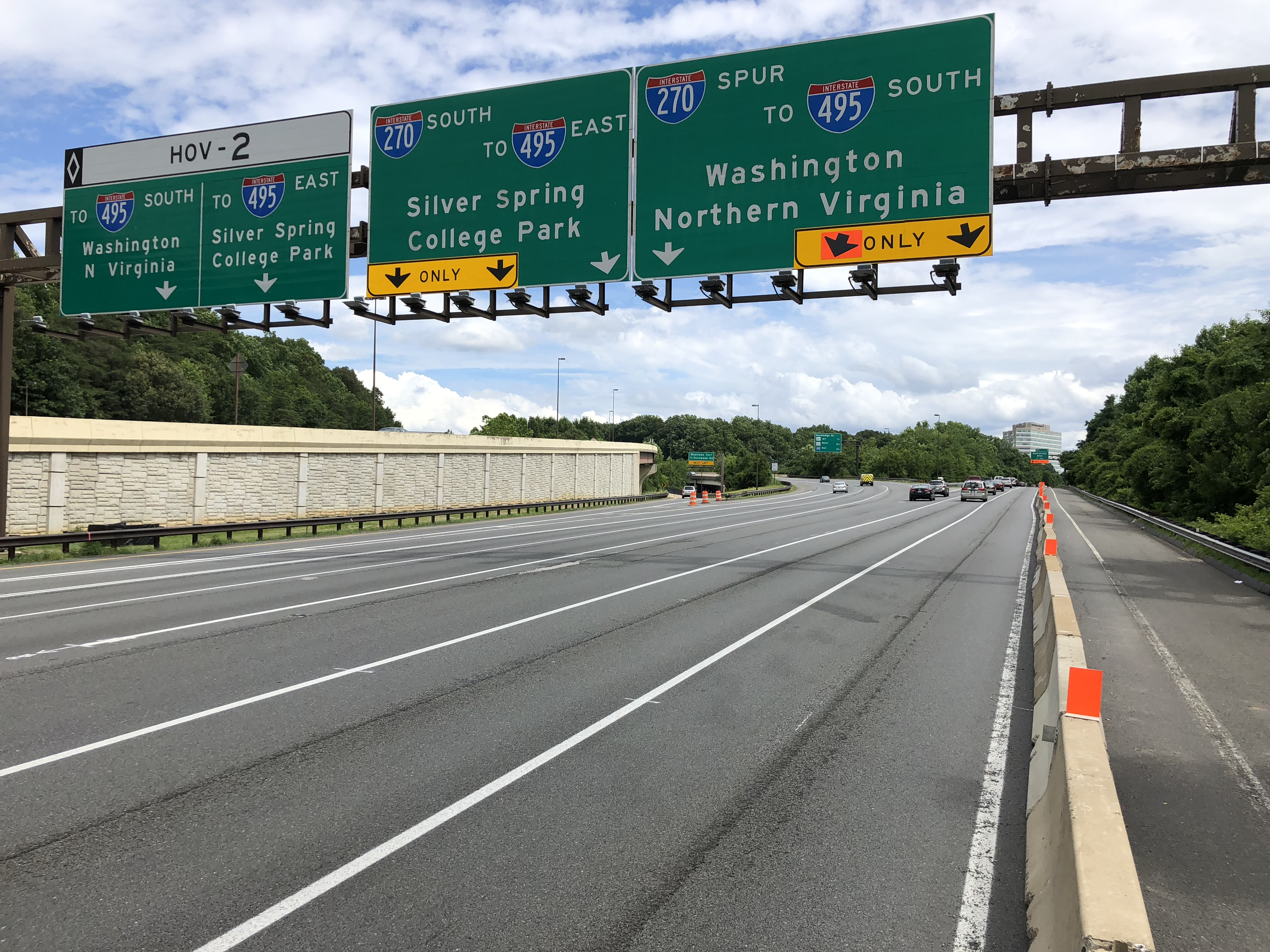
I-270 Spur at split from southbound I-270 in North Bethesda

The US 240 freeway was extended south to Montrose Road in December 1957. I-70S was designated onto the US 240 freeway in 1959, while I-70N was designated onto the US 40 freeway to Baltimore. On December 17, 1958, the freeway extension to Old Georgetown Road opened.

With the completion of the freeway, the original US 240 was newly designated as MD 355. The construction of the Washington National Pike resulted in suburban growth along the corridor between Washington, D.C., and Frederick, with several federal agencies including the United States Atomic Energy Commission and the National Bureau of Standards moving their headquarters to Montgomery County. A western spur that provided access to southbound I-495 was eventually built and became I-270.

I-70S was projected to continue past the Capital Beltway into Washington, D.C., on the North Central Freeway to connect directly to I-95. Plans for this freeway initially began in 1959 when a freeway was called for along the Georgia Avenue corridor. In the mid-1960s, a study was proposed for the freeway that recommended several different routings between Washington, D.C., and the Capital Beltway. By 1966, a route for the North Central Freeway was planned along a Baltimore and Ohio Railroad line running through the northeastern part of Washington and Takoma Park north to the Capital Beltway. In a 1971 study by DeLeuw, Cather Associates and Harry Wesse & Associates, LTD, I-70S was planned to run from its southern terminus at I-495 and run concurrent with that route before turning south on the North Central Freeway and ending at I-95 in Washington. The routing of the freeway through residential areas of Washington drew opposition from residents of the Takoma Park, Brookland, and Michigan Park neighborhoods who were successful in getting the freeway canceled through their neighborhoods in 1970. The North Central Freeway within Maryland was canceled by the Maryland State Highway Administration (MDSHA) in 1972 due to opposition from officials in Montgomery County. In 1975, the Federal Highway Administration (FHWA) officially approved withdrawal of plans to construct the road south of the Capital Beltway. Similar opposition also affected I-70N's eastward extension into Baltimore proper, although a small part of its planned spur, I-170 (now US 40, as the freeway never connected to any other Interstate), was built and opened in 1979. I-70 was eventually truncated to I-695 (the Baltimore Beltway) in 2014, with the freeway to its former terminus designated, but unsigned, as MD 570.

The concurrent US 240 designation was removed from I-70S in 1972. On May 18, 1975, I-70S was designated I-270, with I-70N becoming simply I-70. The western spur is now signed and publicly known simply as I-270 Spur. By the 1980s, traffic congestion had grown on I-270 in Montgomery County; as a result, a $200-million (equivalent to $509 million in 2024) project widened the road between I-495 and MD 118 to its current configuration since October 12, 1990, with some portions being widened from 6 to 12 lanes. HOV lanes were later added on December 19, 1996. This widening led to growth of residences and businesses along the I-270 corridor as far north as Germantown and increased traffic counts along the road. Much of I-270 in Montgomery County is now a hub for biotech firms. By 1999, congestion on the road grew to then-projected 2010 levels.

In Montgomery County, an interchange was constructed to allow northbound and southbound I-270 access both to and from Watkins Mill Road in Gaithersburg. This interchange connects the eastern and western portions of Watkins Mill Road by a new overpass. In addition, a new southbound exit ramp at exit 11 (MD 124) was built. The exit provides better access to the Metropolitan Grove station and Gaithersburg Medical Center. The goal of the project was to lower congestion on I-270, MD 355, and MD 124. The State of Maryland approved the $99.71-million (equivalent to $125 million in 2024) project in July 2017, and construction began on July 11, 2017, with Governor Larry Hogan and County Executive Ike Leggett in attendance for a groundbreaking ceremony. The project was completed on June 11, 2020, a month ahead of schedule.

== Future ==
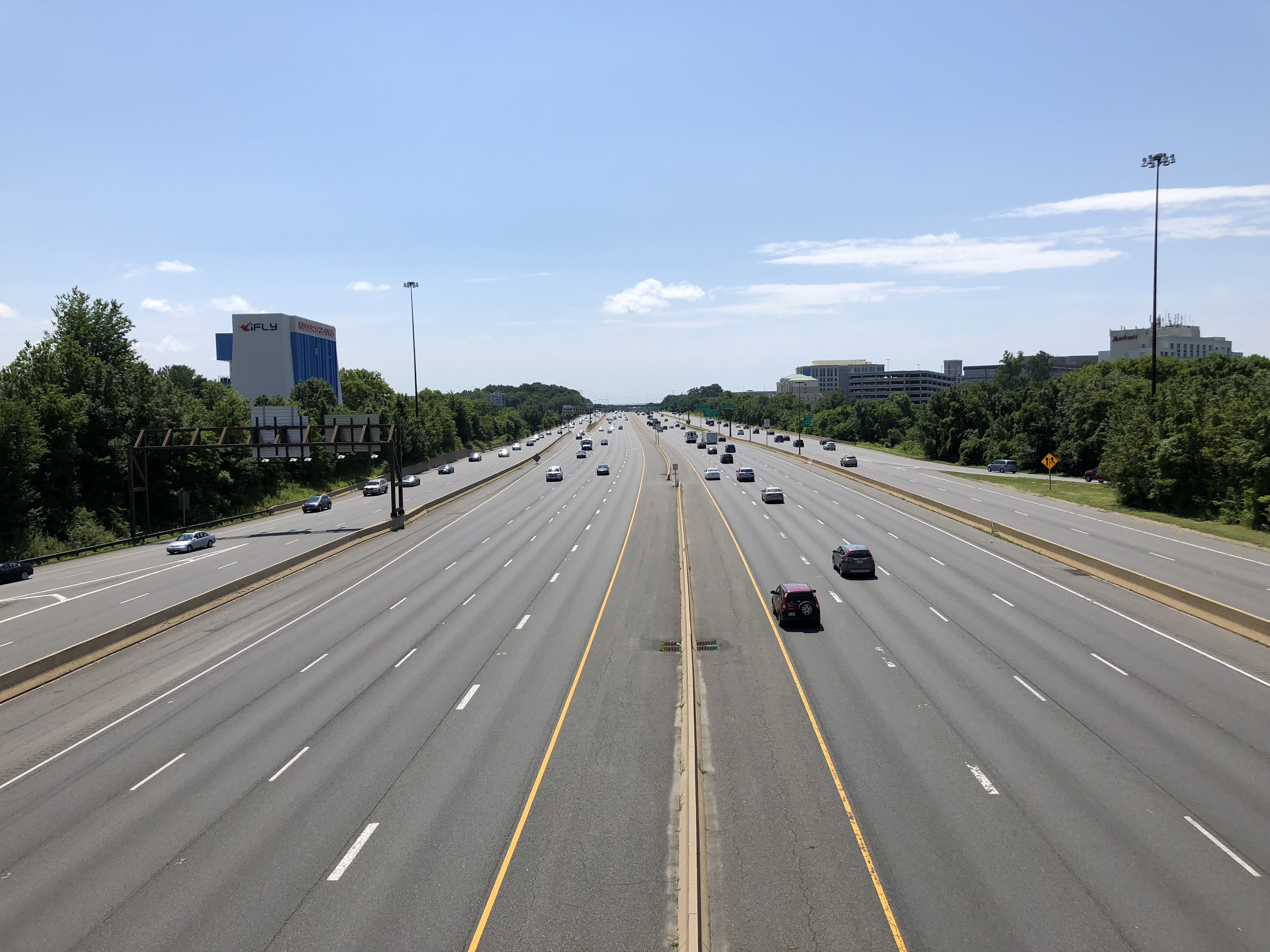
View south along I-270 at I-370 in Gaithersburg, at the north end of proposed HOT lanes

MDSHA is studying improvements for the I-270 corridor between Shady Grove Road and Frederick. Options for improvement include widening the highway to include more lanes with HOV and HOT lanes, as well as initiating rapid bus or light rail service along I-270 between Shady Grove and Clarksburg. In September 2017, Governor Larry Hogan announced a plan to widen the entire length of I-270 by four lanes, adding HOT lanes to the median, as part of a $9-billion proposal to widen roads in Maryland. The project would be a public–private partnership with private companies responsible for constructing, operating, and maintaining the lanes. On June 5, 2019, the Maryland Board of Public Works voted 2–1 in favor of the proposal to construct express toll lanes along I-270, with Governor Hogan and State Comptroller Peter Franchot voting for it and State Treasurer Nancy Kopp voting against it. On June 12, 2019, the Maryland-National Capital Park and Planning Commission (M-NCPPC) sent a letter of nonconcurrence to MDSHA, triggering a mediation process with MDSHA. The M-NCPPC has jurisdiction over parkland MDSHA will need for its proposal.

In June 2021, the project was omitted by the Washington Council of Government's Transportation Planning Board, calling its future into question. In June 2022 Montgomery County Executive Marc Elrich asked the U.S. Department of Transportation (USDOT) to extend its review period for the I-270 toll lane proposal, citing the need for additional time for local agencies and the public to review the environmental analysis. In July 2022 advocates of public transit questioned the validity of Maryland DOT's traffic models for the proposed highway widening project, in a letter submitted to USDOT. In August 2022 the FHWA announced a delay in its review of the proposed project.

In August 2023, Maryland DOT applied for a federal grant to support improvements on the American Legion Bridge and a portion of I-495 leading to the junction with I-270. The application did not include funding for improvements to I-270, but the state intends to include I-270 improvements in future grant applications.

== Exit list ==
County	Location	mi	km	Exit	Destinations	Notes
Montgomery	Bethesda	0.00	0.00	0	I-495 east / MD 355 south – Silver Spring, College Park, Bethesda	Southern terminus; exit 35 on I-495
Montgomery	North Bethesda	1.54– 1.83	2.48– 2.95	1	MD 187 (Old Georgetown Road) / Rockledge Drive (MD 187B)	Signed as exits 1A (MD 187) and 1B (Rockledge) northbound
Montgomery	North Bethesda	2.39– 2.68	3.85– 4.31	2	I-270 Spur south to I-495 south – Washington, Northern Virginia	Southbound exit and northbound entrance
Montgomery	North Bethesda	3.66	5.89	Southern terminus of local-express lanes		
Montgomery	North Bethesda	4.14	6.66	4	Montrose Road (MD 927)	Signed as exits 4A (east) and 4B (west); northbound exit 4A also serves Tower Oaks Boulevard
Montgomery	Rockville	5.50	8.85	5	MD 189 (Falls Road)	SPUI
Montgomery	Rockville	6.46	10.40	6	MD 28 (West Montgomery Avenue) – Rockville, Darnestown, Poolesville	Signed as exits 6A (east) and 6B (west)
Montgomery	Rockville	8.39	13.50	8	Shady Grove Road / Redland Boulevard	
Montgomery	Gaithersburg	9.28	14.93	Northern terminus of southbound local-express lanes		
Montgomery	Gaithersburg	9.32	15.00	9	I-370 east / Sam Eig Highway to MD 200 east	Signed as exits 9A (I-370) and 9B (Sam Eig); exits 1A-B on I-370
Montgomery	Gaithersburg	10.85	17.46	10	MD 117 (Clopper Road / West Diamond Avenue) to MD 124 south (Quince Orchard Road)	Northbound exit and southbound entrance
Montgomery	Gaithersburg	11.47	18.46	11	MD 124 (Montgomery Village Avenue / Quince Orchard Road)	Quince Orchard Road not signed northbound; no direct northbound access to MD 124 south
Montgomery	Gaithersburg	12.17	19.59	12	Watkins Mill Road	
Montgomery	Gaithersburg	12.26	19.73	Northern terminus of northbound local-express lanes		
Montgomery	Germantown	13.97	22.48	13	Middlebrook Road	Northbound exit and southbound entrance; signed as exits 13A (east) and 13B (west)
Montgomery	Germantown	14.74	23.72	15	MD 118 (Germantown Road) to MD 355 – Germantown	Signed as exits 15A (north) and 15B (south)
Montgomery	Germantown	15.78	25.40	16	MD 27 north / Father Hurley Boulevard – Damascus	Signed as exits 16A (north) and 16B (south)
Montgomery	Clarksburg	18.43	29.66	18	MD 121 – Boyds, Clarksburg	
Montgomery	Hyattstown	22.29	35.87	22	MD 109 – Hyattstown, Barnesville, Poolesville, Ijamsville	
Montgomery				Weigh and inspection station		
Frederick	Urbana	26.03	41.89	26	MD 80 – Urbana, Buckeystown	
Frederick	Frederick	31.16	50.15	31	MD 85 to Market Street (MD 355) – Frederick, Buckeystown	Signed as exits 31A (north) and 31B (south); Market Street not signed southbound
Frederick	Frederick			32	I-70 (US 40 east) – Hagerstown, Baltimore	Exit 53 on I-70 Eastbound, Exit 53A on I-70 Westbound
Frederick	Frederick	32.60	52.46	33	To US 15 north – Frederick, Gettysburg	Northern terminus; access via US 40 west
1.000 mi = 1.609 km; 1.000 km = 0.621 mi: Incomplete access; Unopened

== Interstate 270 Spur ==
Interstate 270 Spur
- Location: Bethesda
- Length: 2.10 mi (3.38 km)

Driving southbound on I-270 from Shady Grove Road to the I-270 Spur in June 2026.

Interstate 270 Spur (I-270 Spur; referred to as I-270Y by the MDSHA) is a 2.1-mile (3.4 km) spur off I-270 that connects I-270 and the Capital Beltway. It carries traffic headed southbound on I-270 to southbound I-495 and from northbound I-495 to northbound I-270, filling in the missing movements not available at the interchange between I-270 and I-495. The road heads north from I-495 as a six-lane freeway. The left lane in each direction serves as a HOV lane for carpools with two or more people that is in operation between 3:30 and 6:30 pm on weekdays in the northbound direction and between 6:00 and 9:00 am on weekdays in the southbound direction. I-270 Spur continues north through wooded suburban areas to an interchange with Democracy Boulevard adjacent to the Westfield Montgomery shopping mall. A short distance later, the road has a southbound exit and northbound entrance for the HOV lanes onto Fernwood Road. Past here, I-270 Spur merges into northbound I-270 with separate ramps for the travel lanes and the HOV lanes. Before 1975, when I-270 was called I-70S, this road was called I-270, without the word "Spur".

=== Exit list ===
The entire route is in Bethesda, Montgomery County.

mi	km	Exit	Destinations	Notes
0.00	0.00	—	I-495 south – Washington, Northern Virginia	Southern terminus; exit 38 on I-495 (Capital Beltway)
1.00	1.61	1	Democracy Boulevard	
1.35	2.17	—	Westlake Terrace to Fernwood Road	Southbound exit and northbound entrance from HOV lanes
2.10	3.38	—	I-270 north – Rockville, Frederick	Northern terminus; exit 2 on I-270
1.000 mi = 1.609 km; 1.000 km = 0.621 mi: HOV only
