= Dawsonville, Maryland =

Unincorporated community in Maryland, United States

Coordinates: 39°07′42″N 77°20′35″W

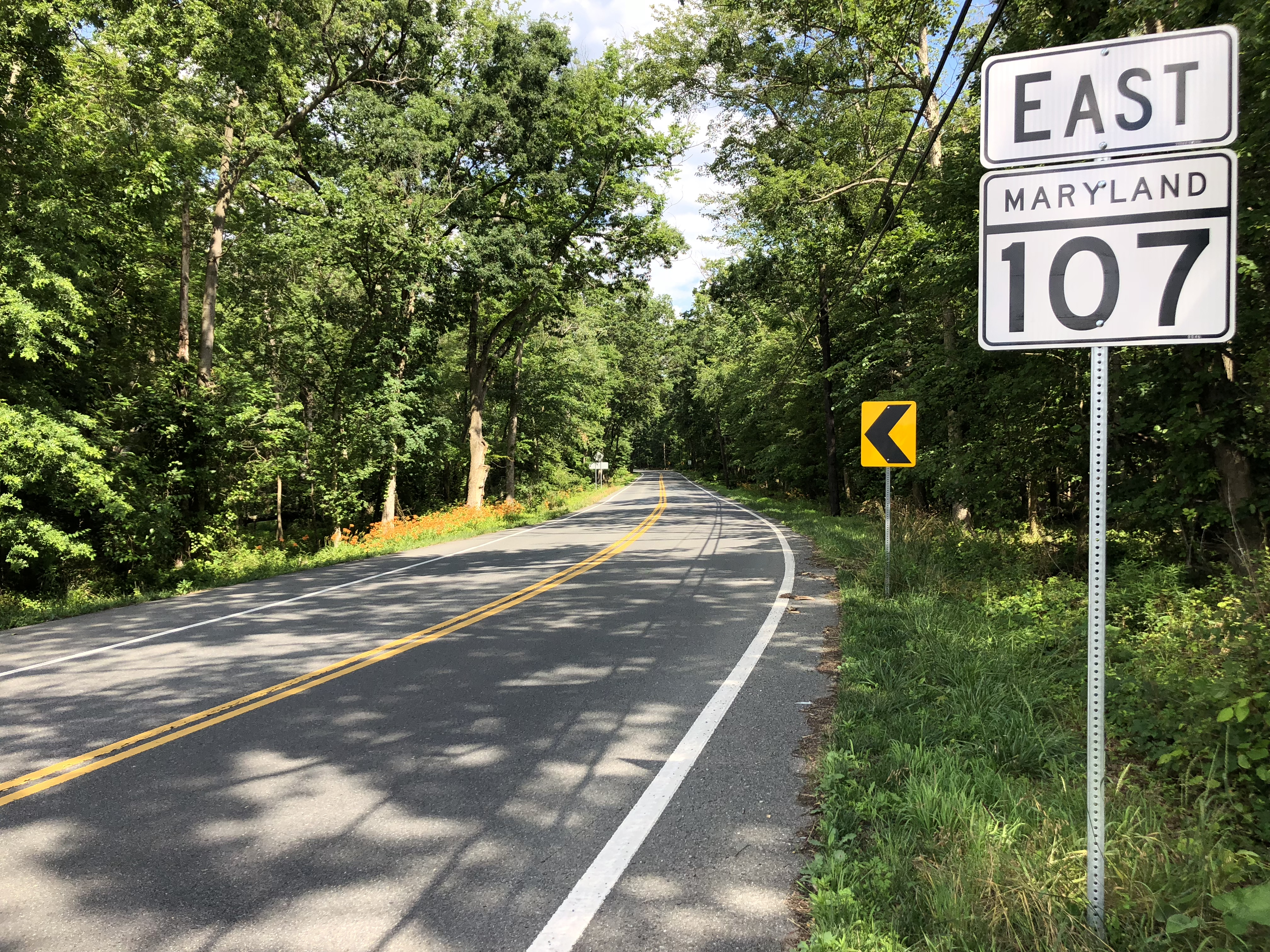
- Maryland Route 107 in Dawsonville.
- Interactive map of Dawsonville, Maryland
- Country: United States of America
- State: Maryland
- State: Montgomery County
- Elevation: 305 ft (93 m)

Dawsonville is an unincorporated community in Montgomery County, Maryland, United States.

Dawsonville was established in 1750 by Thomas Dawson in land that was previously part of Frederick County, but became part of Montgomery County, following the 1776 division of Frederick County. Before the community's founding, Dawson lived in Charles County.
