= Shady Grove Road =

County highway in Montgomery County, Maryland, US

Route information
- Maintained by Montgomery County Department of Transportation
- Length: 6.52 mi (10.49 km)

Major junctions
- South end: Piney Meetinghouse Road in North Potomac
- MD 28 in Rockville; I-270 in Rockville; MD 355 in Redland; I-370 / MD 200 Toll in Redland; Midcounty Highway in Redland
- North end: MD 115 in Redland

Location
- Country: United States
- State: Maryland
- County: Montgomery

Highway system
- County Roads in Montgomery County

Shady Grove Road is a county highway in Montgomery County in the U.S. state of Maryland. It is named after Shady Grove, Maryland. The highway runs 6.52 miles (10.49 km) from Piney Meetinghouse Road in North Potomac north to Maryland Route 115 (MD 115) in Redland. Shady Grove Road is a six-lane arterial serving the corridor between the corporate limits of the cities of Rockville and Gaithersburg. The county highway parallels Interstate 370 (I-370) and runs perpendicular to MD 28, I-270, and MD 355 in central Montgomery County. Shady Grove Road has existed since the late 19th century. The county highway has been paved between what were then MD 28 and U.S. Route 240 (US 240; now MD 355) since at least the 1940s, when the highway was extended north to Washington Grove. Shady Grove Road was expanded to a multilane divided highway and extended north to MD 115 in the mid- to late 1970s. The highway's original mid-1950s interchange with I-270 was reconstructed in the late 1980s, and its late 1980s interchange with I-370 and the Washington Metro access road was upgraded to also connect with MD 200 in the late 2000s. Shady Grove Road was extended to its southern terminus in the early 2000s.

== Route description ==
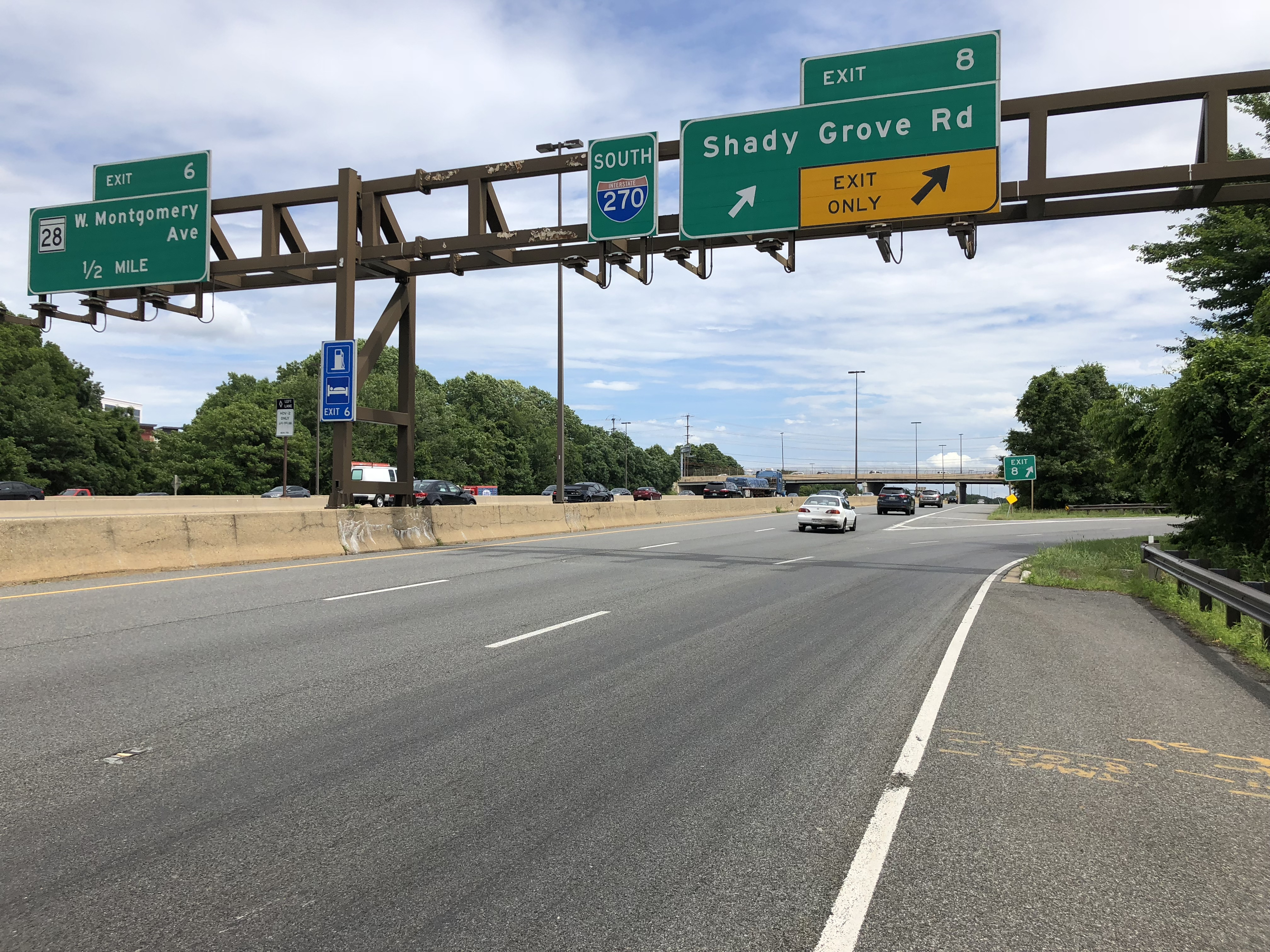
Interstate 270 at Shady Grove Road

Shady Grove Road begins at a four-legged intersection in the unincorporated area of North Potomac. Piney Meetinghouse Road forms the southwest and northwest legs of the intersection, and Cavanaugh Drive heads southeast from the junction. Shady Grove Road heads northeast as a four-lane undivided highway. The road becomes a divided highway shortly before it curves southeast and then back northeast again to pass around the Universities at Shady Grove higher education center. From the northeast corner of the campus, Shady Grove Road intersects Darnestown Road, expands to six lanes, and passes between the city limit of Rockville immediately to the east and Adventist HealthCare Shady Grove Medical Center. The highway intersects MD 28 (Key West Avenue) and meets I-270 (Eisenhower Memorial Highway) at a six-ramp partial cloverleaf interchange; I-270's southbound and northbound exit ramps also have access to Omega Drive and Fields Road to the west and Redland Boulevard to the east.

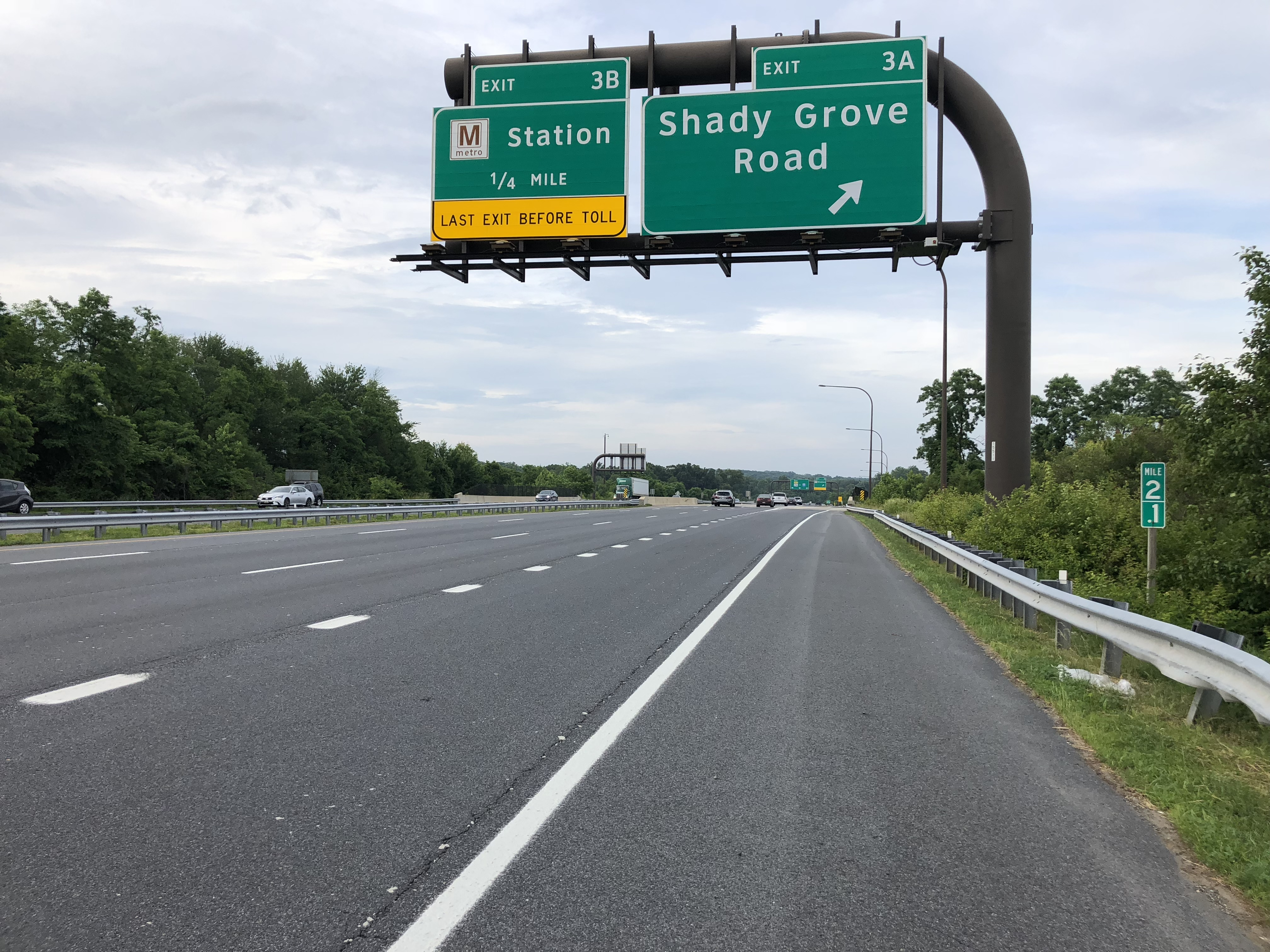
I-370 at Shady Grove Road

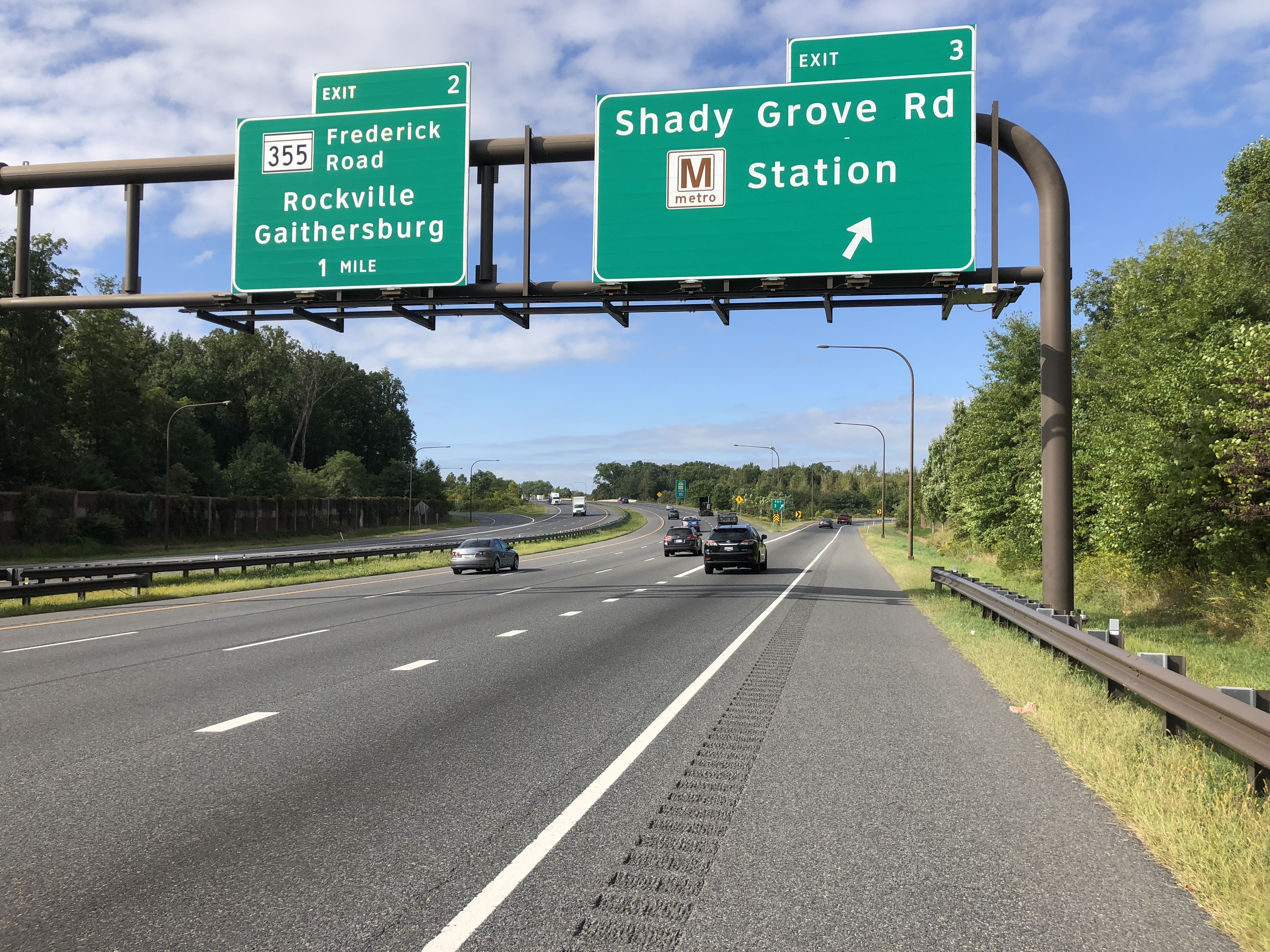
MD-200 at Shady Grove Road

North of I-270, Shady Grove Road forms the boundary between the cities of Rockville and Gaithersburg. The highway receives an exit ramp from eastbound I-370 at the northwest corner of the city of Rockville before the county route intersects MD 355 (Frederick Road) immediately to the east of I-370's partial interchange with the state highway. Shady Grove Road parallels I-370 through a salient of the city of Gaithersburg and enters the unincorporated area of Redland. After the county route meets the south end of Oakmont Avenue, it veers away from the Interstate and crosses over CSX's Metropolitan Subdivision rail line. Shady Grove Road next has a partial cloverleaf interchange with I-370, MD 200 (Intercounty Connector), and the Metro Access Road, which heads southeast to the north park and ride at Shady Grove station, the northwestern terminus of Washington Metro's Red Line. The interchange includes separate entrance and exit ramps from Shady Grove Road to each of westbound I-370 and eastbound MD 200 at the I-370–MD 200 trumpet interchange to the west. Shady Grove Road crosses Mill Creek and passes under MD 200 before its junction with the east end of Midcounty Highway. The highway reaches its northern terminus at MD 115 (Muncaster Mill Road); the roadway continues north as Airpark Road toward Montgomery County Airpark.

Shady Grove Road is maintained by the Montgomery County Department of Transportation. The county highway is a part of the National Highway System from MD 28 north to Midcounty Highway. In an average day of traffic in 2022, Shady Grove Road had a maximum volume of 37,201 vehicles between the Metro Access Road interchange and Midcounty Highway and a minimum volume of 31,371 vehicles between Darnestown Road and MD 28, not including the unmeasured section between Piney Meetinghouse Road and Darnestown Road.

== History ==
The portion of the Shady Grove Road between the Darnestown Road east of the village of Hunting Hill and the Frederick Road northwest of the village of Derwood was laid out rudimentarily between 1865 and 1894. By 1908, a lesser road also extended north from a point east of the Shady Grove Road-Frederick Road intersection north toward Washington Grove. By 1944, the road north of Frederick Road, then designated US 240, had been relocated to the same intersection as the road south of Frederick Road, and the name Shady Grove Road was explicitly applied to the medium-duty paved road from Darnestown Road, then designated MD 28, at Hunting Hill to a point in Washington Grove southeast of MD 124.

As of 1951, Shady Grove Road's primary intersection between MD 28 and US 240 was with Fields Road, which ran from Muddy Branch Road east to US 240 at Derwood. The Washington National Pike freeway, which was first designated US 240 and later became I-270, was constructed through its interchange with Shady Grove Road between 1954 and 1956. After the US 240 four-ramp partial cloverleaf interchange at Shady Grove Road was built, Fields Road was split into two pieces on either side of US 240. The southbound US 240 ramps connected with the western piece of Fields Road, while the northbound US 240 ramps linked with the eastern portion of Fields Road. Traffic on Fields Road turned onto Shady Grove Road and crossed US 240 to continue on the other side of the freeway.

The first divided highway expansion of Shady Grove Road was from the northern Fields Road intersection to south of MD 355, which was under construction by 1970 and completed by 1972. The portions of Shady Grove Road immediately south of MD 355 and from Darnestown Road to the southern Fields Road intersection were reconstructed as a divided highway between 1975 and 1977. Construction on the Shady Grove Road extension from Oakmont Avenue to MD 115, as well as the divided highway reconstruction of the section from MD 355 to Oakmont Avenue, was under way by 1976 and completed by 1978.

The first piece of the freeway accessing the north park and ride of the Shady Grove Metro station was built from the Metro station to Shady Grove Road between 1983 and 1985. The access from Shady Grove Road to the Metro station was via a pair of slip ramps to the access road. Construction on the rest of Shady Grove Road's interchange with the Metro access freeway, including Shady Grove Road's bridge across the freeway, was underway by 1985 and completed between 1987 and 1989 when I-370 had been completed from Shady Grove Road to I-270. Between 1987 and 1991, as part of I-270 reconstruction and expansion, Shady Grove Road's interchange with I-270 was reconstructed to its present 6-ramp partial cloverleaf with ramps to Omega Drive and Redland Boulevard.

By 1993, Shady Grove was six lanes from Darnestown Road to Midcounty Highway and four lanes to MD 115. Shady Grove Road was expanded from four to six lanes north of Midcounty Highway between 2002 and 2004. Construction on Shady Grove Road's southern extension to Piney Meetinghouse Road was also underway by 1993, when the south leg was added to the Shady Grove Road–Darnestown Road intersection to serve the university campus. Construction south from the university campus stub and north from Piney Meetinghouse Road was underway by 1998, a couple years after MD 28 had been removed from Darnestown Road and designated on Key West Avenue through a March 8, 1996, memorandum of action. Shady Grove Road's southern extension was completed by 2002. Reconstruction of Shady Grove Road's interchange with the Metro access freeway as part of MD 200 construction was underway by 2008 and completed in 2010 as part of the project to construct the first segment of MD 200.

== Junction list ==
The entire route is in Montgomery County.

Location	mi	km	Destinations	Notes
North Potomac	0.00	0.00	Piney Meetinghouse Road / Cavanaugh Drive east – Travilah	Southern terminus
Rockville	1.61	2.59	Darnestown Road	
Rockville	2.42	3.89	MD 28 (Key West Avenue) – Rockville, Darnestown	
Rockville	2.93	4.72	I-270 (Eisenhower Memorial Highway) – Frederick, Washington	I-270 Exit 8
Redland	3.95	6.36	MD 355 (Frederick Road) to I-370 west / I-270 – Rockville, Gaithersburg	
Redland	4.97	8.00	I-370 west to I-270 / MD 200 Toll east (Intercounty Connector) – Metro Station	I-370 Exit 3A; MD 200 Exit 3; intersecting freeway is officially MD 200A
Redland	5.92	9.53	Midcounty Highway west – Gaithersburg	
Redland	6.52	10.49	MD 115 (Muncaster Mill Road) – Flower Hill, Aspen Hill, Montgomery County Airpark	Northern terminus
1.000 mi = 1.609 km; 1.000 km = 0.621 mi
