= Maryland Route 124 =

State highway in Montgomery County, Maryland, US

Maryland Route 124
- Maryland Route 124 highlighted in red

Route information
- Maintained by MDSHA
- Length: 17.03 mi (27.41 km)
- Existed: 1927–present

Major junctions
- South end: MD 28 in Darnestown
- MD 119 in Gaithersburg; MD 117 in Gaithersburg; I-270 in Gaithersburg; MD 355 in Gaithersburg; MD 115 near Redland
- North end: MD 108 in Damascus

Location
- Country: United States
- State: Maryland
- Counties: Montgomery

Highway system
- Maryland highway system; Interstate; US; State; Scenic Byways
← MD 122	→ MD 125

Maryland Route 124 (MD 124) is a state highway in the U.S. state of Maryland. The highway runs 17.03 miles (27.41 km) from MD 28 in Darnestown north to MD 108 in Damascus. MD 124 connects the central and northern Montgomery County communities of Gaithersburg, Montgomery Village, Redland, Laytonsville, and Damascus. The route is a major conduit on the western and northern sides of Gaithersburg, where the highway serves the National Institute of Standards and Technology and the former Lakeforest Mall and connects with Interstate 270 (I-270) and MD 355. MD 124 continues north past the Montgomery County Airpark, beyond which the route changes from a four- to six-lane divided highway to a two-lane undivided road as it passes west of Laytonsville on its way to Damascus.

MD 124 was built from Laytonsville south to Redland by 1910 and constructed from Gaithersburg to its southern end in the early 1910s. The intervening segment between Gaithersburg and Redland was built via Washington Grove in the early 1920s. MD 124's original route was completed when Laytonsville–Damascus highway was constructed between the mid-1920s and early 1930s. The highway bypassed Laytonsville in the late 1950s. MD 124 was rerouted through the western portion of Gaithersburg in the mid-1970s along a highway built in the mid-1950s concurrent with I-270 construction; the old route eventually became part of MD 117. In the mid-1990s. the highway was rerouted again north of MD 355, bypassing downtown Gaithersburg and Washington Grove along highways built by Montgomery County in the mid-1970s and late 1980s. MD 124 was expanded to a divided highway around I-270 by the mid-1970s, between there and its southern end in the late 1980s and late 1990s, along its northern bypass of Gaithersburg when it was placed on the bypass, and near the Montgomery County Airpark in 2010.

== Route description ==
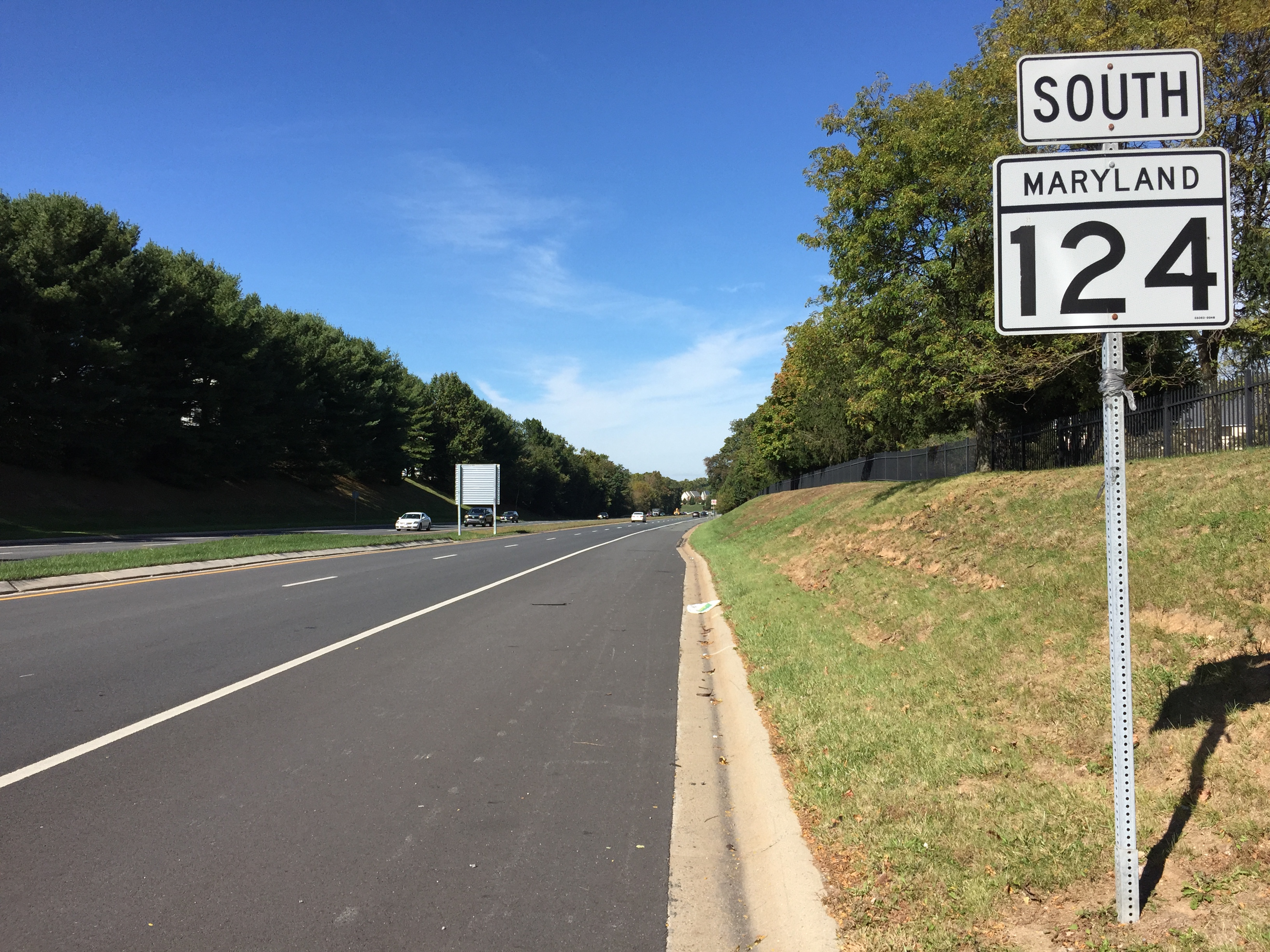
View south along the Midcounty Highway portion of MD 124 in Gaithersburg

MD 124 begins as Quince Orchard Road at an intersection with MD 28 (Darnestown Road) northeast of Quince Orchard High School in Darnestown, just southwest of the southwestern corner of the city of Gaithersburg. Quince Orchard Road heads south as a county highway into North Potomac. MD 124 heads northeast as a four-lane divided highway that follows the city limit to Long Draft Road and Kentlands Boulevard; the latter street provides access to the New Urbanism community of Kentlands. The state highway veers east into the city and intersects MD 119 (Great Seneca Highway). MD 124 again follows a city limit of Gaithersburg where it veers north and becomes an undivided highway along the western edge of the National Institute of Standards and Technology campus, which occupies an unincorporated enclave within the city.

MD 124 fully re-enters Gaithersburg at its junction with MD 117, which heads west as Clopper Road and east as West Diamond Avenue toward downtown Gaithersburg. The highway remains undivided until its passes under CSX's Metropolitan Subdivision railroad line, which carries MARC's Brunswick Line. North of the railroad crossing, MD 124 has a partial cloverleaf interchange with I-270 (Eisenhower Memorial Highway), with a park and ride lot serving MTA Maryland commuter buses located in the southwest quadrant of the interchange. There is no access from northbound MD 124 to southbound I-270 or from northbound I-270 to southbound MD 124; those movements are made via MD 117. North of its underpass of the freeway, MD 124 expands to six lanes and again to eight lanes for a short distance on either side of its intersection with MD 355 (Frederick Road). Including turn lanes, the highway is 11 lanes wide on the south side of the intersection. There is no direct access from southbound MD 124 to southbound MD 355; that movement is made via Russell Avenue, which provides access to the former Lakeforest Mall to the east.

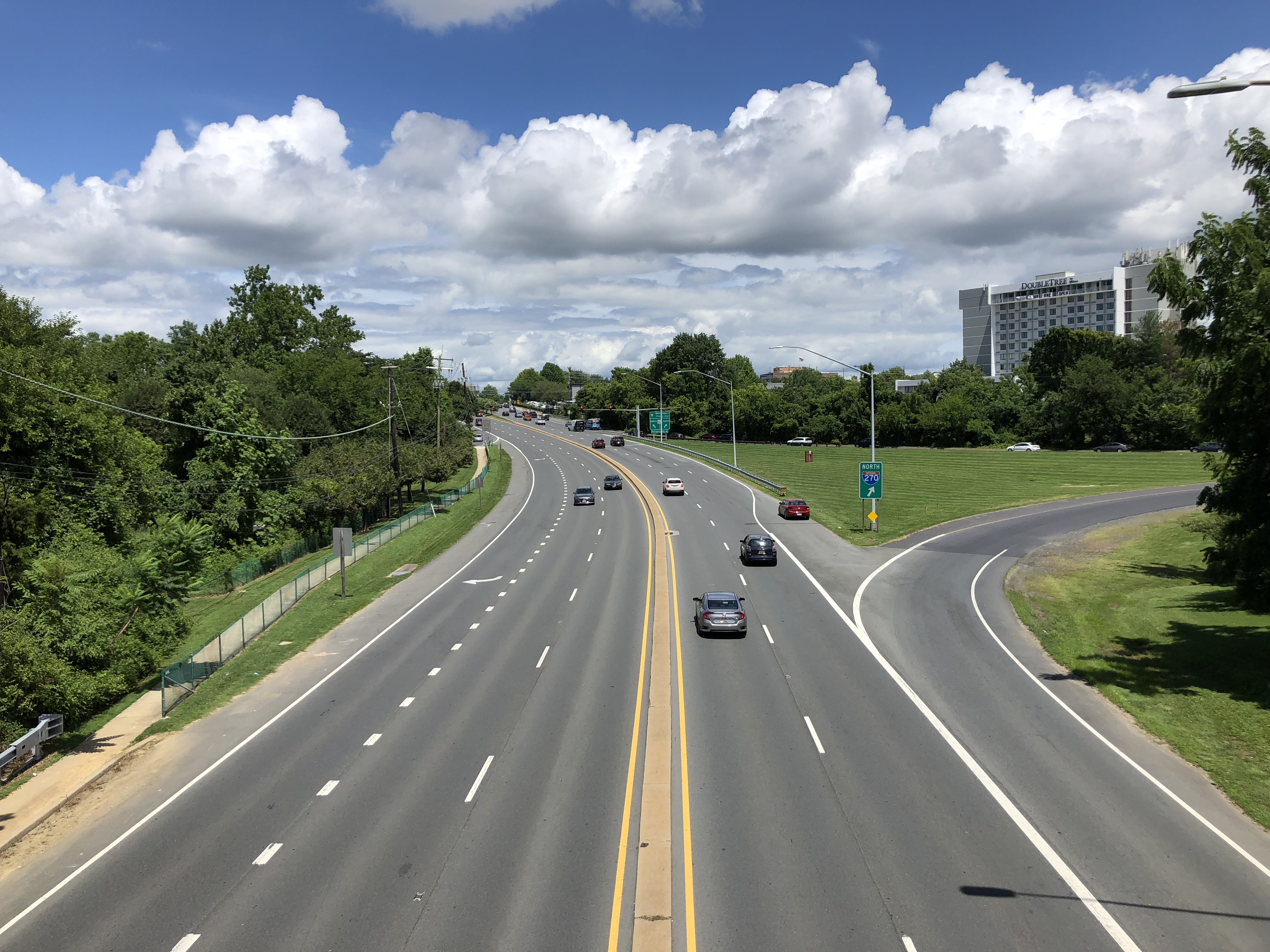
View north along MD 124 from I-270 in Gaithersburg

MD 124 continues north from MD 355 as six-lane Montgomery Village Avenue. North of the former mall, the state highway leaves the city limits and turns east onto four-lane Midcounty Highway; Montgomery Village Avenue continues through the heart of Montgomery Village. MD 124 re-enters Gaithersburg at its intersection with Goshen Road. The highway leaves and enters the city limits again around its crossing of Whetstone Run. East of the stream, MD 124 turns north onto Woodfield Road, a four-lane divided highway that exits Gaithersburg for the last time at Emory Grove Road and drops to three lanes (two northbound, one southbound), and then two. The highway expands to a four-lane divided highway again between Flower Hill Way—which leads to Washington Grove Lane, which leads to the town of Washington Grove—and MD 115 (Muncaster Mill Road) on the western edge of Redland. MD 124 continues as a four-lane undivided highway through an industrial area surrounding the Montgomery County Airpark.

South of Airpark Road, which provides access to the airport, MD 124 expands to a six-lane divided highway, which it remains until Fieldcrest Road. North of that county road, the highway gradually drops lanes and the median until it is a two-lane highway at East Village Avenue, a county highway into the northeastern part of Montgomery Village. MD 124 passes to the west of Laytonsville; access to the town is provided via Warfield Road and Brink Road. North of the latter highway, the state highway crosses Goshen Branch and Great Seneca Creek. MD 124 passes through the hamlet of Woodfield and parallels the Magruder Branch of Great Seneca Creek into the unincorporated community of Damascus. The highway reaches its northern terminus on the eastern edge of downtown Damascus at an intersection with MD 108 (Main Street). Woodfield Road continues north as a county highway; either MD 108 or Woodfield Road may be used to access MD 27 (Ridge Road).

MD 124 is a part of the National Highway System as a principal arterial from MD 28 to the Midcounty Highway–Woodfield Road intersection in Gaithersburg.

== History ==
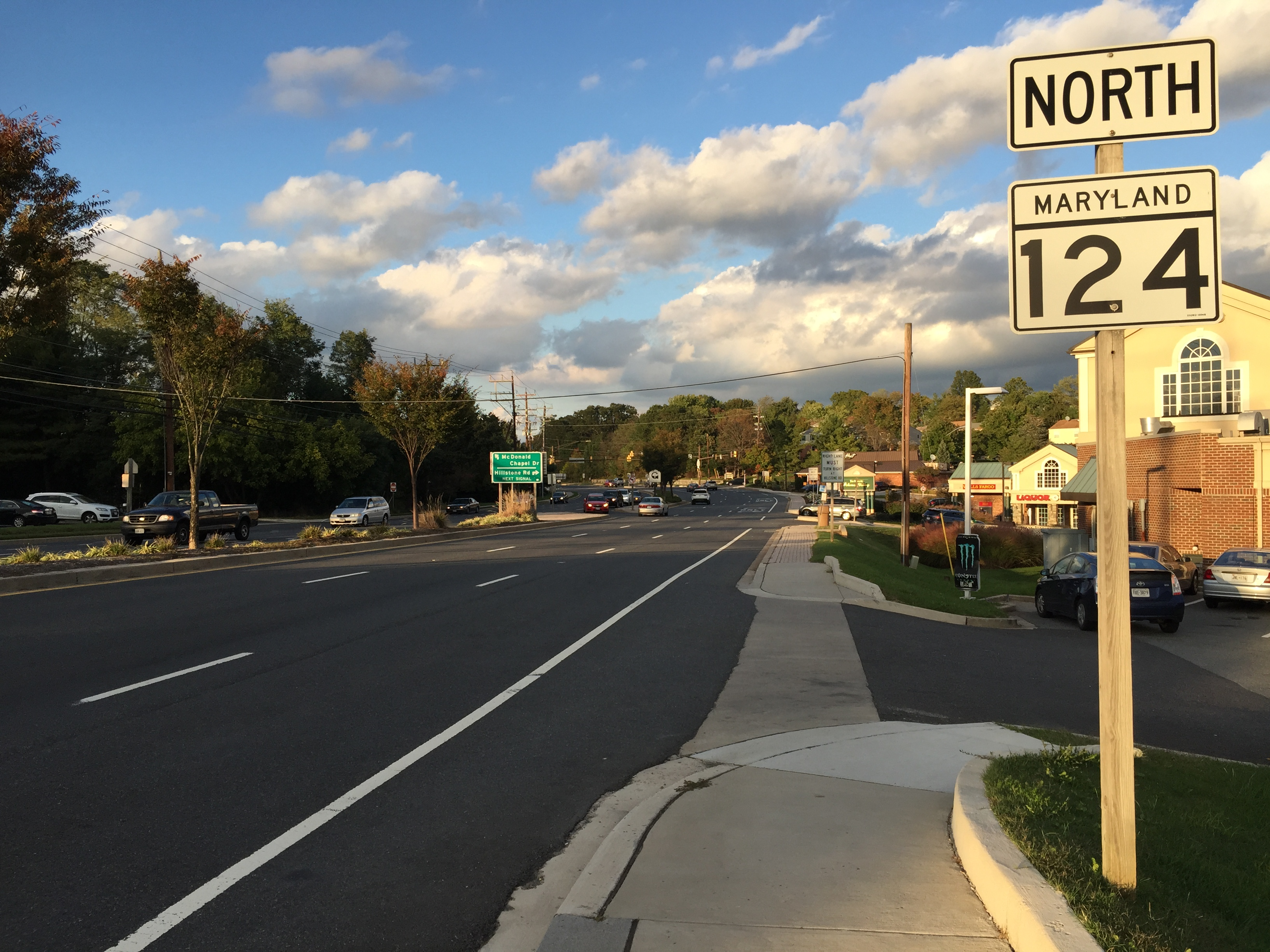
MD 124 northbound at MD 28 in Darnestown

The first portion of MD 124 constructed as a modern highway was from Muncaster Mill Road to Warfield Road, then along Warfield Road and Laytonsville Road to Brink Road in Laytonsville. This section was paved as a macadam road by Montgomery County with state aid by 1910. The second segment to be built was from Darnestown Road to Clopper Road, then east along what is now MD 117 to the west town limit of Gaithersburg. This portion was planned as one of the original state roads by the Maryland State Roads Commission in 1909. The highway was placed under construction in 1911 and completed as a 14-foot-wide (4.3 m) macadam road in 1912. The continuation of the highway along West Diamond Avenue to Frederick Road in Gaithersburg was completed in 1914. The gap between Gaithersburg and Muncaster Mill Road was filled with a concrete road by 1921. This highway followed East Diamond Avenue through downtown Gaithersburg to Washington Grove, then Washington Grove Lane north to Muncaster Mill Road. MD 124 traversed the gap between the two Diamond Avenues by following Frederick Road; that road's first bridge across the Baltimore and Ohio Railroad (now CSX) was constructed in 1930. After the bridge was built, MD 124 had oblique intersections with U.S. Route 240 (now MD 355) on both sides of the railroad.

Construction on the highway between Laytonsville and Damascus began in 1925; a concrete road was built from the center of Laytonsville west along Brink Road, then north along Woodfield Road to Goshen Branch. The concrete road was extended to Great Seneca Creek in 1928. The concrete road was started from the Damascus end in 1929 and extended to Woodfield by 1930. The gap between Great Seneca Creek and Woodfield was filled between 1931 and 1933; the highway was signed as MD 124 in the latter year when it was completed. MD 124's present course between Warfield Road and Brink Road was paved as a concrete road by 1950, but it did not become part of MD 124 until 1959. Warfield Road was transferred to Montgomery County and Brink Road from MD 124 to MD 108 became part of MD 420, a designation that lasted until 1974.

Quince Orchard Road was extended north from the MD 124–MD 117 intersection to MD 355 concurrent with the construction of its interchange with Washington National Pike (now I-270) between 1954 and 1956. Access between the freeway and MD 124 was via the full cloverleaf interchange on the county-maintained segment of Quince Orchard Road; no interchange was constructed directly with MD 124. Montgomery Village Avenue was constructed from MD 355 north through Montgomery Village in 1974. The next year, MD 124 was removed from West Diamond Avenue and placed on Quince Orchard Road north to MD 355, then ran concurrently with MD 355 to downtown Gaithersburg. West Diamond Avenue was renumbered MD 924 by 1981 and then MD 117 by 1999. By 1978, MD 124 was expanded to a four-lane divided highway from just south of the I-270 interchange to MD 355 then along MD 355 part of the way to downtown Gaithersburg. The divided highway was completed along the MD 124–MD 355 concurrency in 1979.

MD 124 was expanded to a four-lane divided highway from I-270 south to Long Draft Road in 1987. The divided highway was extended south to MD 28 in 1997. Midcounty Highway was built as a two-lane county highway from Montgomery Village Avenue to Shady Grove Road by 1989. MD 124 was expanded to a divided highway on either side of the MD 115 intersection in 1991. South of the intersection was a new alignment; the route used Flower Hill Way to bridge the gap between the new road and the old road, Washington Grove Lane. In 1995, the new divided highway was extended south to Midcounty Highway; Midcounty Highway was expanded to a divided highway from the new divided highway west to Montgomery Village Avenue; and MD 124 was removed from East Diamond Avenue and Washington Grove Lane and placed on its present course. MD 117's partial interchange with I-270 opened in 1987; two redundant ramps at the MD 124–I-270 interchange were removed in 1995. The ramp from southbound I-270 to northbound MD 124 was removed in favor of a traffic signal–controlled left turn in 2004. The state highway was expanded from an undivided two-to-three-lane road to a six-lane divided highway from south of Airpark Road to Fieldcrest Road in 2010.

== Junction list ==
The entire route is in Montgomery County.

Location	mi	km	Destinations	Notes
Gaithersburg	0.00	0.00	MD 28 (Darnestown Road) / Quince Orchard Road south – Darnestown, Rockville	Southern terminus
Gaithersburg	1.19	1.92	MD 119 (Great Seneca Highway) – Germantown, Rockville	
Gaithersburg	2.73	4.39	MD 117 (West Diamond Avenue/Clopper Road) to I-270 south – Germantown	
Gaithersburg	3.22	5.18	I-270 (Eisenhower Memorial Highway) – Frederick, Washington	I-270 Exit 11; no access from northbound MD 124 to southbound I-270 or from northbound I-270 to southbound MD 124
Gaithersburg	3.59	5.78	MD 355 (Frederick Road) – Rockville, Germantown	
Gaithersburg	6.01	9.67	Midcounty Highway east to Shady Grove Road	MD 124 turns from Midcounty Highway to Woodfield Road
Redland	6.95	11.18	MD 115 east (Muncaster Mill Road) – Norbeck	Western terminus of MD 115
Damascus	17.03	27.41	MD 108 (Main Street) to MD 27 / Woodfield Road north – Laytonsville, Mount Airy	Northern terminus
1.000 mi = 1.609 km; 1.000 km = 0.621 mi: Incomplete access

== Related route ==
=== Midcounty Highway ===
Midcounty Highway is a 3.09-mile-long (4.97 km) highway with state- and county-maintained sections in Montgomery County in the U.S. state of Maryland. The western 1.67-mile-long (2.69 km) portion of the highway is part of MD 124 between Montgomery Village Avenue and Woodfield Road in Gaithersburg. The eastern 1.42-mile-long (2.29 km) segment of the highway is maintained by the Montgomery County Department of Transportation and connects MD 124 with Shady Grove Road in Redland. All of Midcounty Highway is part of the National Highway System. The county segment of Midcounty Highway begins at a four-legged intersection in the city of Gaithersburg. MD 124 heads west along Midcounty Highway and north along Woodfield Road; the south leg of the intersection is Saybrooke Oaks Boulevard. Midcounty Highway heads east as a four-lane divided highway into Redland. The highway's first intersection is with Washington Grove Lane, which was formerly MD 124. Midcounty Highway then passes by Shady Grove Middle School, crosses Mill Creek, and intersects Miller Fall Road before reaching its eastern terminus at Shady Grove Road.

The Montgomery County Department of Transportation and the Montgomery Planning subsidiary of the Maryland-National Capital Park and Planning Commission have been planning Midcounty Highway, which it has designated M-83, since the 1960s. They have planned the highway as a four- to six-lane divided highway extending 8.7 miles (14.0 km) from MD 27 (Ridge Road) in Clarksburg southeast to Redland Road in Redland. The main existing section of Midcounty Highway was constructed from Montgomery Village Avenue in Gaithersburg east to Shady Grove Road in 1988 and 1989. MD 124 was assigned to the portion of Midcounty Highway west of Woodfield Road through an October 27, 1998, road transfer agreement among SHA, the Montgomery County Department of Transportation, and the city of Gaithersburg. The portion of Midcounty Highway between Woodfield Road and Shady Grove Road remained a county highway. In addition to the segment between Montgomery Village Avenue and Shady Grove Road, a 0.23-mile-long (0.37 km) two-lane segment of the highway exists at the east end of Middlebrook Road in Germantown. In 2025, Montgomery Planning decided to remove the portion of the highway from MD 27 to Montgomery Village Avenue from its long-term planning processes because they anticipate the transportation needs of the area can be handled through existing highways and transit. The agency decided to retain the southern portion of the planned right of way, from Shady Grove Road through Redland Road to the MD 200 (Intercounty Connector) right of way, for further study.
