= Shady Grove, Maryland =

- Unincorporated area
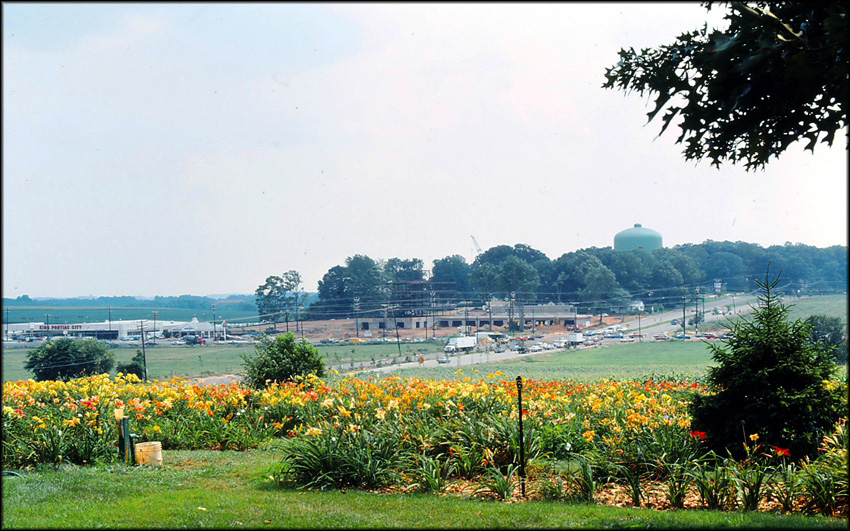
- Shady Grove in 1978

- Location of Montgomery County in the U.S. state of Maryland.
- Coordinates: 39°7′5.88″N 77°11′2.34″W
- Country: United States of America
- State: Maryland
- County: Montgomery
- Time zone: UTC-5 (Eastern (EST))
  - Summer (DST): UTC-4 (EDT)
- ZIP code: 20850, 20855
- Area codes: 301, 240
- GNIS feature ID: 1711357

Shady Grove is an unincorporated area of Montgomery County, Maryland, United States. It has a population of 5,000-7,000, between the cities of Rockville and Gaithersburg, mostly in zip codes 20850 and 20855, though the exact boundaries are not officially defined.

== History ==
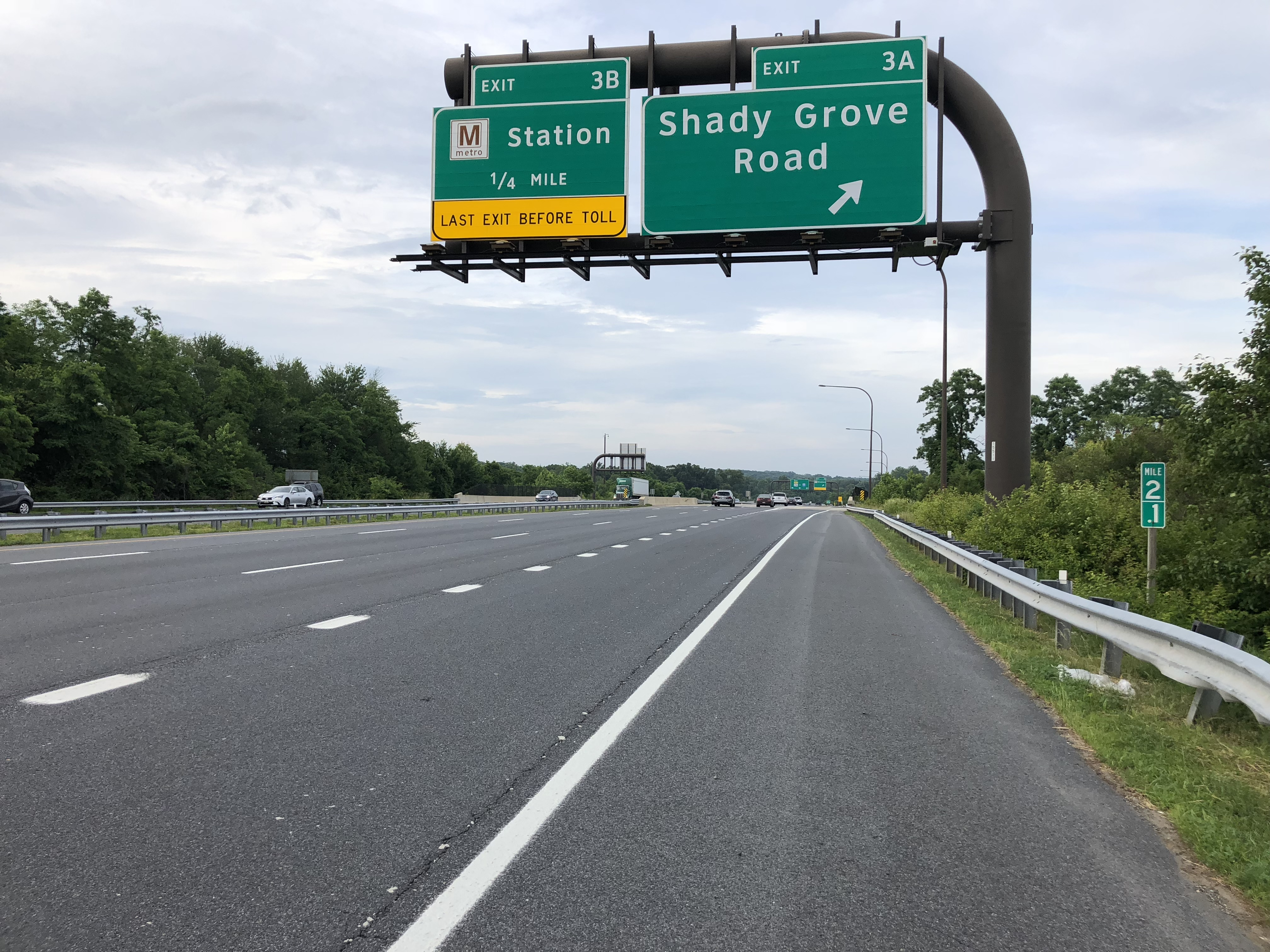
I-370 at Shady Grove Road

Shady Grove is one of Montgomery County's upper middle class areas. The area is best identified by Shady Grove Road, which is located near exit 8 off of I-270. Other notable places in the area that bear the name are:

- Shady Grove Metrorail station, although it is located in Redland, Maryland
- Shady Grove Medical Village and Shady Grove Life Sciences Center
  - Shady Grove Adventist Hospital, although it is located in Rockville, Maryland.
- Shady Grove Executive Center
- The Universities at Shady Grove
