= Maryland Route 115 =

State highway in Montgomery County, Maryland, known as Muncaster Mill Rd

Maryland Route 115
- Muncaster Mill Road
- Maryland Route 115 highlighted in red

Route information
- Maintained by MDSHA
- Length: 5.83 mi (9.38 km)
- Existed: 1928–present

Major junctions
- West end: MD 124 in Redland
- MD 28 at Norbeck
- East end: MD 655 at Norbeck

Location
- Country: United States
- State: Maryland
- Counties: Montgomery

Highway system
- Maryland highway system; Interstate; US; State; Scenic Byways
← US 113	→ MD 117

Maryland Route 115 (MD 115) is a state highway in the U.S. state of Maryland. Known as Muncaster Mill Road, the highway runs 5.83 miles (9.38 km) from MD 124 near Redland east to MD 655 at Norbeck. MD 115 is a northwest–southeast highway that connects the suburban communities of Redland and Norbeck in central Montgomery County. The highway was constructed from MD 124 to MD 28 in the late 1920s and early 1930s.

== Route description ==
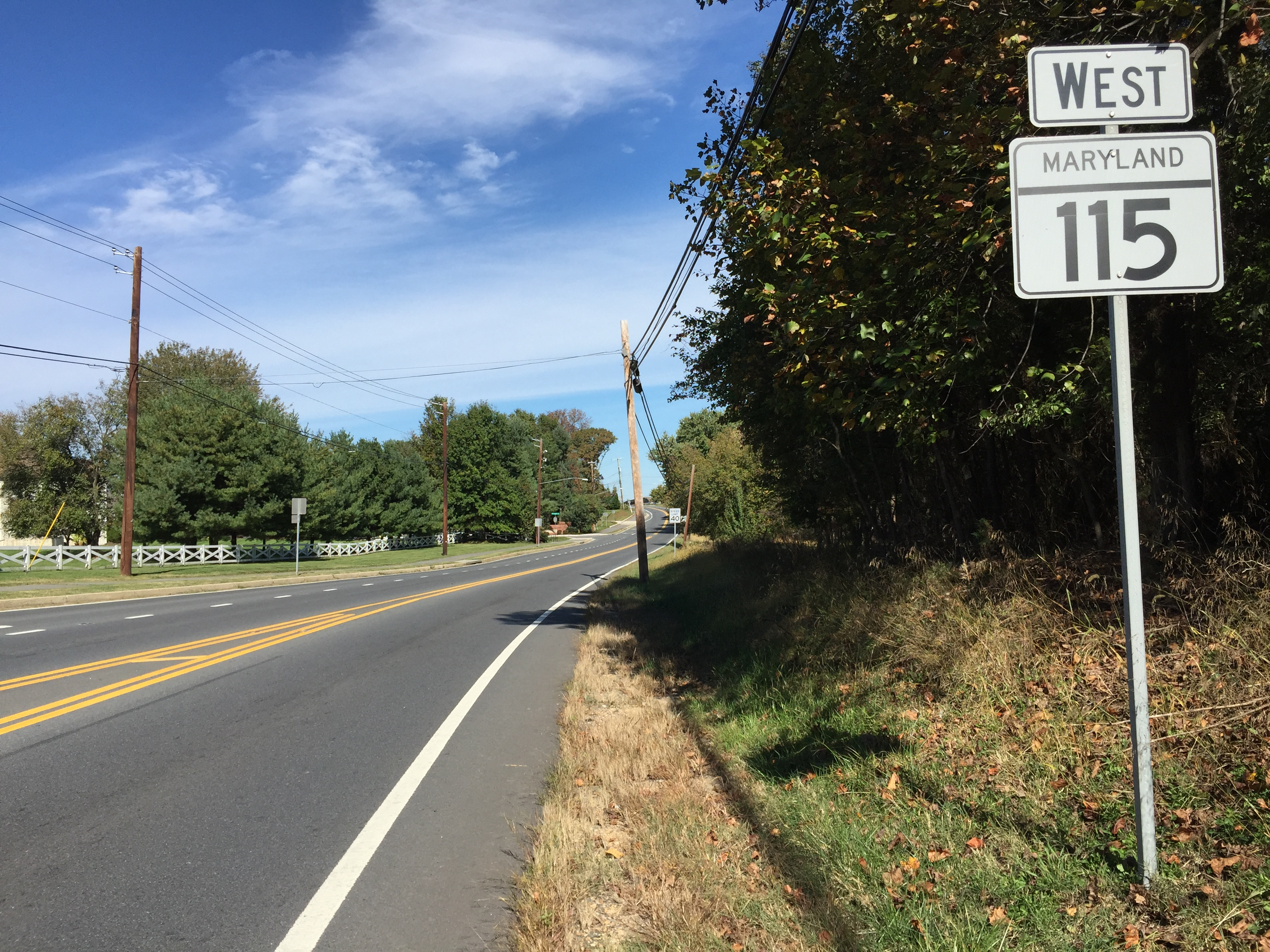
View west along MD 115 at Avery Road in Redland

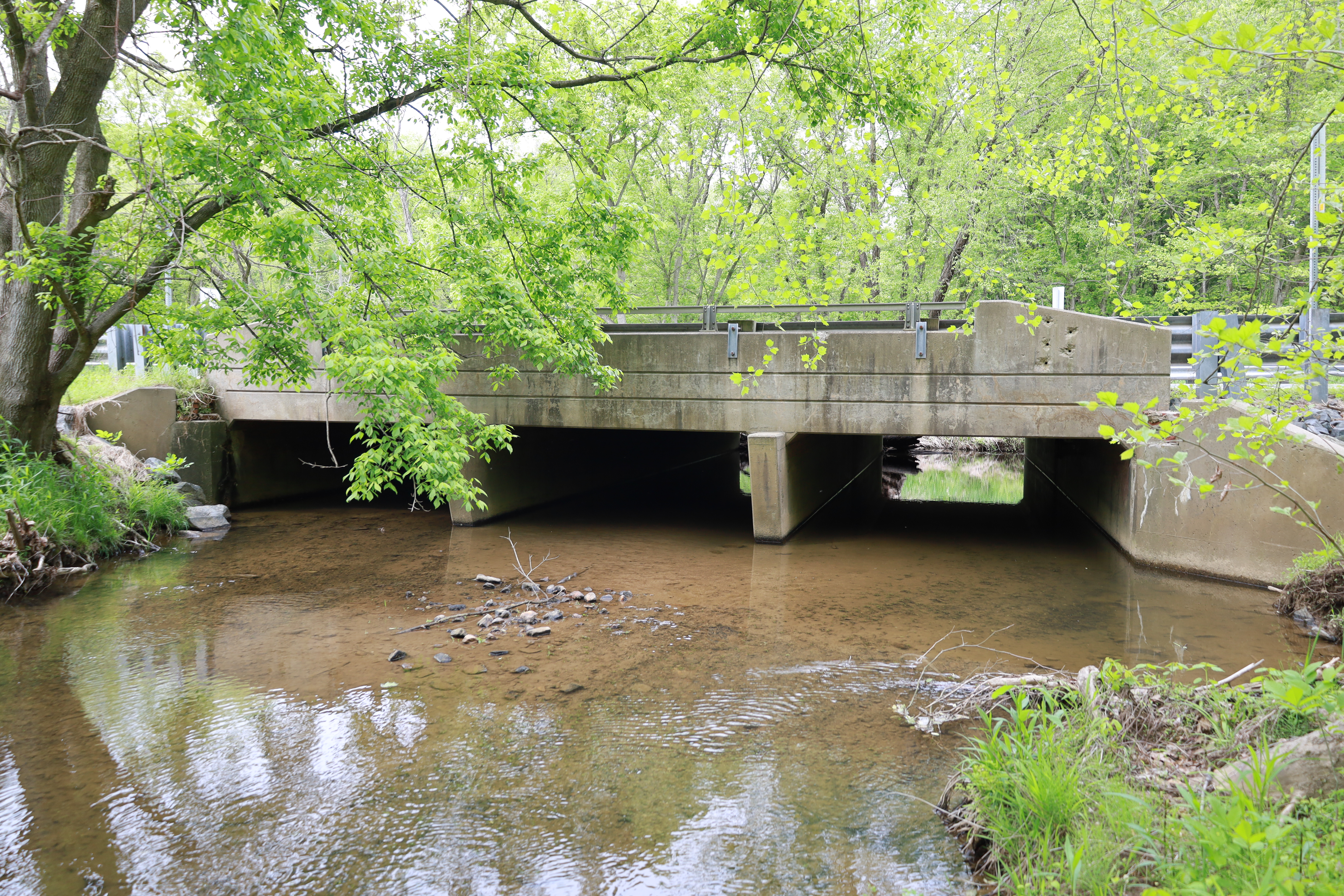
Muncaster Mill Road crossing of Rock Creek

MD 115 begins at an intersection with MD 124 (Woodfield Road) adjacent to the industrial area surrounding the Montgomery County Airpark near the unincorporated area of Redland. The west leg of the intersection is county-maintained Snouffer School Road, which heads toward Montgomery Village. MD 115 begins as a four-lane divided highway but rapidly reduces to a two-lane undivided road as it head southeast toward the center of Redland. The highway temporarily widens as it passes a large church. MD 115 expands to a four-lane divided highway just west of its intersection with Shady Grove Road and Airpark Road. The highway becomes undivided and reaches the center of Redland at its intersection with Redland Road and Muncaster Road. MD 115 drops to two lanes with a center left-turn lane, which disappears just west of another large church.

East of Redland Middle School, the highway crosses Rock Creek and passes Colonel Zadok A. Magruder High School. Southeast of the high school, MD 115 crosses over MD 200 (Intercounty Connector) and the parallel ICC Trail. The highway and the freeway are connected by a pair of emergency ramps but no public access; the southern ramp connects MD 115 with the hiker-biker trail that parallels the freeway. MD 115 crosses the North Branch of Rock Creek on its way to Norbeck, where the highway intersects MD 28 (Norbeck Road) just west of MD 28's intersection with MD 97 (Georgia Avenue). MD 115 continues a very short distance beyond the MD 28 intersection to its terminus at MD 655 (Old MD 28), which is an L-shaped service road that parallels MD 28 and MD 97.

== History ==
The first segment of MD 115 was a 18-foot-wide (5.5 m) macadam road built from MD 124 to Redland Road in 1928. This segment was extended east to Rock Creek in 1929 and 1930. In addition, a separate portion of MD 115 was constructed as a macadam road from MD 28 at Norbeck west to Emory Lane near the North Branch of Rock Creek. The eastern and western segments were unified between 1931 and 1933. MD 28 was relocated and expanded to a divided highway at Norbeck in 1983; however, MD 115's eastern terminus remained old MD 28. MD 115 was expanded to a four-lane divided highway at its western terminus in 1991 and at the intersection with Shady Grove Road and Airpark Road by 1999. The highway's overpass of MD 200 and the connecting emergency ramps were completed in 2010.

== Junction list ==
The entire route is in Montgomery County.

Location	mi	km	Destinations	Notes
Redland	0.00	0.00	MD 124 (Woodfield Road) / Snouffers School Road west – Washington Grove, Laytonsville	Western terminus
Norbeck	5.80	9.33	MD 28 (Norbeck Road) to MD 97 / MD 200 Toll – Rockville, Norwood, Olney	
Norbeck	5.83	9.38	MD 655 (Old MD 28)	Eastern terminus; MD 655 is unsigned
1.000 mi = 1.609 km; 1.000 km = 0.621 mi
