= List of highways numbered 375 =

Route 375 or Highway 375 may refer to:

== Canada ==
- Manitoba Provincial Road 375
- New Brunswick Route 375
- Saskatchewan Highway 375

== Japan ==
- Japan National Route 375

== United States ==
- Interstate 375
- Arkansas Highway 375
- Florida State Road 375
- Georgia State Route 375 (former)
- Maryland Route 375 (unsigned)
- Nevada State Route 375
- New York State Route 375
- Puerto Rico Highway 375
- Texas State Highway Loop 375
- Virginia State Route 375
- Wyoming Highway 375

Preceded by 374	Lists of highways 375	Succeeded by 376
