= List of highways numbered 367 =

The following highways are numbered 367:

== Brazil ==
- BR-367

== Canada ==
- Manitoba Provincial Road 367
- Quebec Route 367
- Saskatchewan Highway 367

== India ==
- National Highway 367 (India)

== Japan ==
- Japan National Route 367

== United States ==
- Arkansas Highway 367
- County Road 367 (Wakulla County, Florida)
  - County Road 367A (Wakulla County, Florida)
- Georgia State Route 367 (former)
- Maryland Route 367
- Missouri Route 367
- New York State Route 367
- Ohio State Route 367 (former)
- Pennsylvania Route 367
- Puerto Rico Highway 367
- Tennessee State Route 367
- Virginia State Route 367

Preceded by 366	Lists of highways 367	Succeeded by 368
