= List of highways numbered 374 =

The following highways are numbered 374:

== Canada ==
- Manitoba Provincial Road 374
- Nova Scotia Route 374
- Saskatchewan Highway 374

== Japan ==
- Japan National Route 374

== Spain ==
- Autovía A-374

== United Kingdom ==
- A374 road

== United States ==
- Arkansas Highway 374
- Georgia State Route 374
- Maryland Route 374
- Nevada State Route 374
- New York State Route 374
- Ohio State Route 374
- Pennsylvania Route 374
- Puerto Rico Highway 374
- Tennessee State Route 374
- Farm to Market Road 374
- Virginia State Route 374
- Wyoming Highway 374

Preceded by 373	Lists of highways 374	Succeeded by 375
