= List of highways numbered 370 =

The following highways are numbered 370:

== Canada ==
- New Brunswick Route 370
- Newfoundland and Labrador Route 370
- Quebec Route 370

== Japan ==
- Japan National Route 370

== United Kingdom ==
- A370 road

== United States ==
- Interstate 370
- U.S. Route 370 (former)
- Arkansas Highway 370
- Colorado State Highway 370
- Florida State Road 370
- Georgia State Route 370
- Iowa Highway 370
- Maryland Route 370
- Missouri Route 370
- Nebraska Highway 370
- New York State Route 370
- Ohio State Route 370
- Oregon Route 370
- Pennsylvania Route 370
- Puerto Rico Highway 370
- Virginia State Route 370
- Wyoming Highway 370 (unsigned)

Preceded by 369	Lists of highways 370	Succeeded by 371
