= List of highways numbered 366 =

The following highways are numbered 366:

== Brazil ==
- 25px

== Canada ==
- Manitoba Provincial Road 366
- Nova Scotia Route 366
- Quebec Route 366

== India ==
- National Highway 366 (India)

== Japan ==
- Route 366 (Japan)

== Malaysia ==
- FT 366 Federal Route 366

== United States ==
- U.S. Route 366
  - U.S. Route 366 (1926)
  - U.S. Route 366 (1932–1939)
- Arizona State Route 366
- Florida State Road 366
- Georgia State Route 366 (former)
- Hawaii Route 366
- Louisiana Highway 366
- Maryland Route 366
- Mississippi Highway 366
- Missouri Route 366
- New York State Route 366
- Ohio State Route 366
- Pennsylvania Route 366
- Texas State Highway Spur 366
- Virginia State Route 366

Territories

- Puerto Rico Highway 366

Preceded by 365	Lists of highways 366	Succeeded by 367
