= List of highways numbered 368 =

The following highways are numbered 368:

== Canada ==
- Nova Scotia Route 368
- Quebec Route 368
- Saskatchewan Highway 368

== Hong Kong ==
- Asian Highway 368

== Japan ==
- Japan National Route 368

== United Kingdom ==
- A368 road

== United States ==
- Arkansas Highway 368
- Colorado State Highway 368
- Florida:
  - Florida State Road 368
    - Florida State Road 368 (former)
  - County Road 368 (Wakulla County, Florida)
- Georgia State Route 368
- K-368 (Kansas highway)
- Maryland Route 368
- New York State Route 368 (former)
- Ohio State Route 368
- Pennsylvania Route 368
- Puerto Rico Highway 368
- Tennessee State Route 368
- Texas State Highway Loop 368
- Virginia State Route 368

Preceded by 367	Lists of highways 368	Succeeded by 369
