= List of highways numbered 372 =

The following highways are numbered 372:

== International ==
- European route E372

== Canada ==
- Quebec Route 372

== Japan ==
- Japan National Route 372

== United States ==
- Connecticut Route 372
- Georgia State Route 372
- Maryland Route 372
- Nevada State Route 372
- New York State Route 372
- Ohio State Route 372
- Pennsylvania Route 372
- Puerto Rico Highway 372
- Virginia State Route 372
- Wyoming Highway 372

Preceded by 371	Lists of highways 372	Succeeded by 373
