= Shady Grove station =

Washington Metro station

Shady Grove
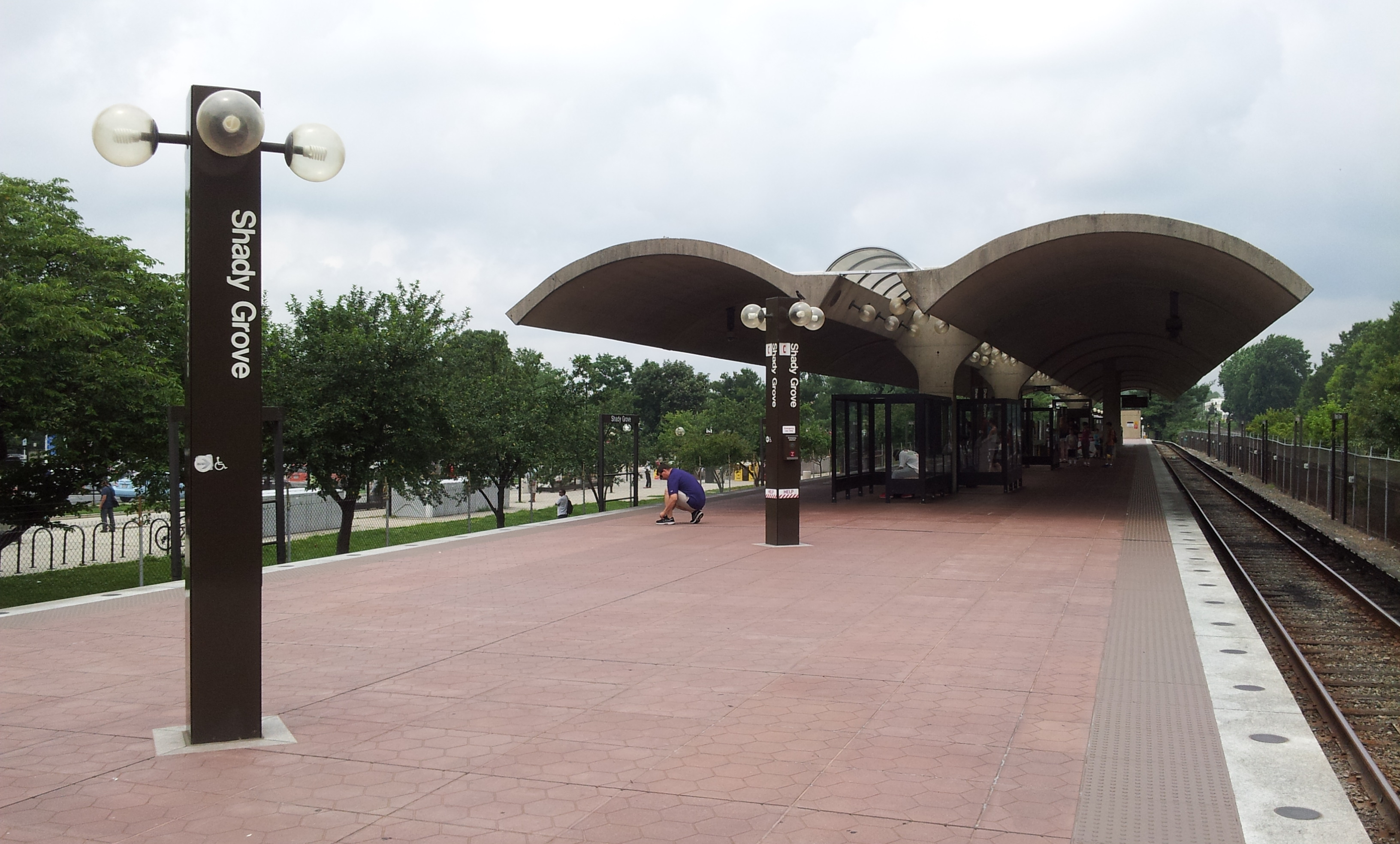
- Station platform in June 2013, facing northwest

General information
- Location: Redland, Maryland, U.S.
- Coordinates: 39°7′12″N 77°9′53″W
- Owner: Washington Metropolitan Area Transit Authority
- Platforms: 1 island platform
- Tracks: 2
- Connections: Ride On: 43, 53, 55, 57, 58, 59, 60, 61, 63, 64, 65, 66, 67, 71, 73, 74, 76, 78, 79, 90, 100, 101, Pink, Lime; MTA Maryland Bus: 201, 505, 515; NIH Bethesda Shuttles: NCI to Shady Grove Metro Express

Construction
- Structure type: At grade
- Parking: 5,467 spaces
- Cycle facilities: Capital Bikeshare, 32 racks, 60 lockers
- Accessible: Yes

Other information
- Station code: A15

History
- Opened: December 15, 1984; 41 years ago

Passengers
- 2025: 7,346 (average weekday)
- Rank: 17 of 98

Services
Preceding station	Washington Metro	Following station
Terminus	Red Line	Rockville toward Glenmont
Route map
Location

Shady Grove station is a Washington Metro station in Redland, Montgomery County, Maryland, United States. The station opened on December 15, 1984, as part of a four-stop extension of the Red Line from Grosvenor–Strathmore station to Shady Grove. The station is operated by the Washington Metropolitan Area Transit Authority (WMATA).

Serving as the northwestern terminus of the Red Line, it is the most distant Metro station in Maryland from downtown Washington, D.C. The station is the location of the Shady Grove Rail Yard, one of the largest storage yards in the Metrorail system.

== Location ==
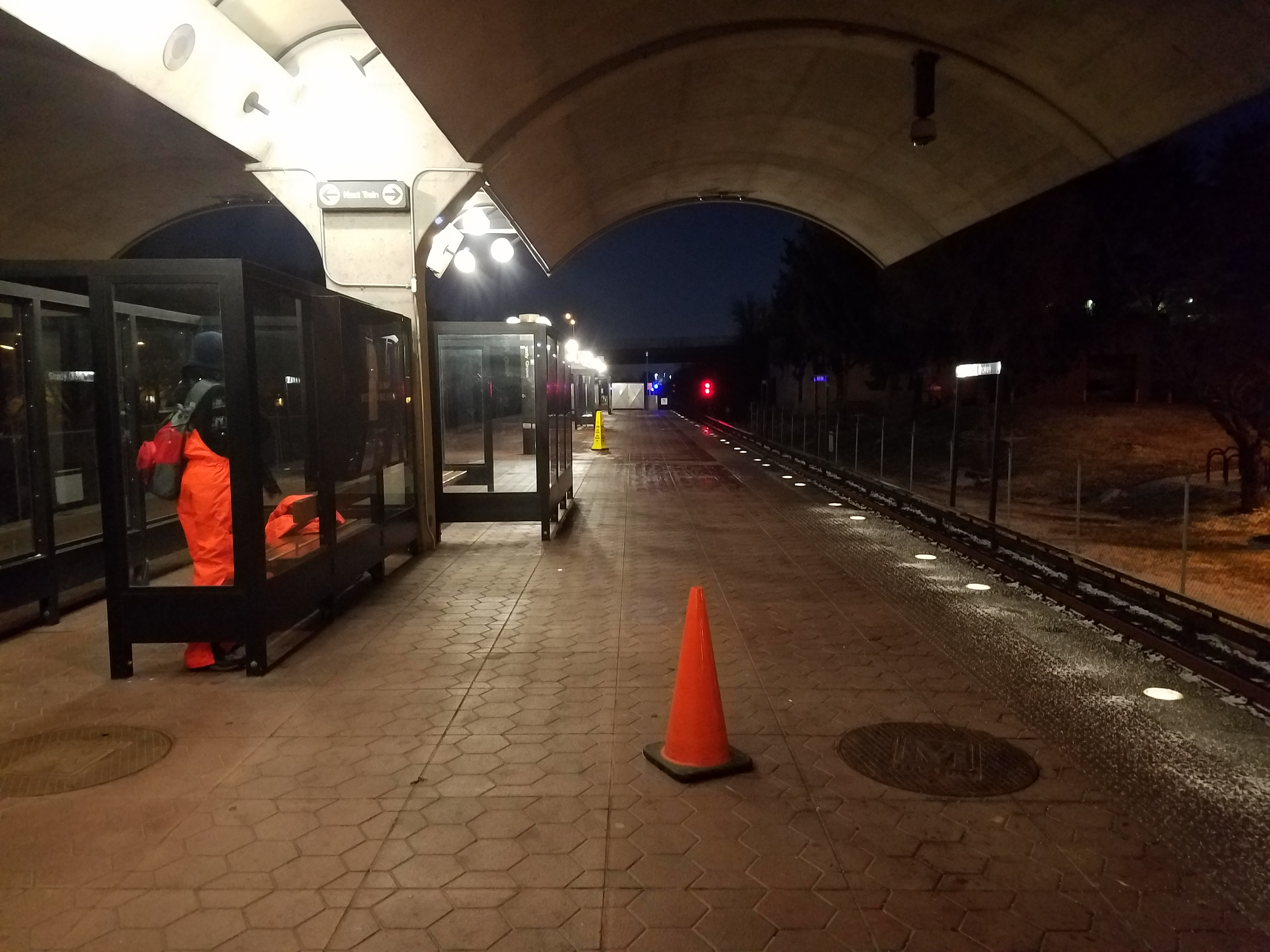
Shady Grove facing northeast in January 2017.

Located in the census-designated place of Redland, the station takes its name from nearby Shady Grove Road to the north. Much of the surrounding area is industrial or low-density residential in nature, although Rockville Road to the south contains strips of commercial activity. To the west is MD 355 (Frederick Road), a continuation of Rockville Pike, which the Red Line parallels throughout much of its route in western Montgomery County; MD 200A connects the Shady Grove station to I-370 and MD 200, better known as the Intercounty Connector. a toll road extending east to I-95.

The station is the northernmost station in the Washington Metro system and is approximately equidistant from downtown Washington, D.C. and Frederick. Prior to the opening of the Silver Line Extension to Ashburn, it was also the most distant Metro station (by straight-line distance) from the Washington Monument. It still is the most distant in Maryland. The distance from Shady Grove to the Washington Monument is 18.39 miles (29.60 km).

=== Transit-oriented development ===
In order to cope with increasing population growth and subsequent traffic congestion while combating urban sprawl, the Montgomery County Planning Department released the Shady Grove Sector Plan, which aims to act as a guideline for mixed-use growth around the station. The plan emphasizes high-density residential and commercial properties within the immediate vicinity of Shady Grove station, with a steady transition to low-density as the distance from the station increases.

The Sector Plan divides the surrounding area into five districts: Metro North, Metro East, Metro West, Metro South, and Jeremiah Park. Combined, there will be over 6,000 residential units within walking distance of Shady Grove station. In addition, the plan encourages the creation of a walkable street grid with defined main streets integrated with a comprehensive open space and park system.

== History ==
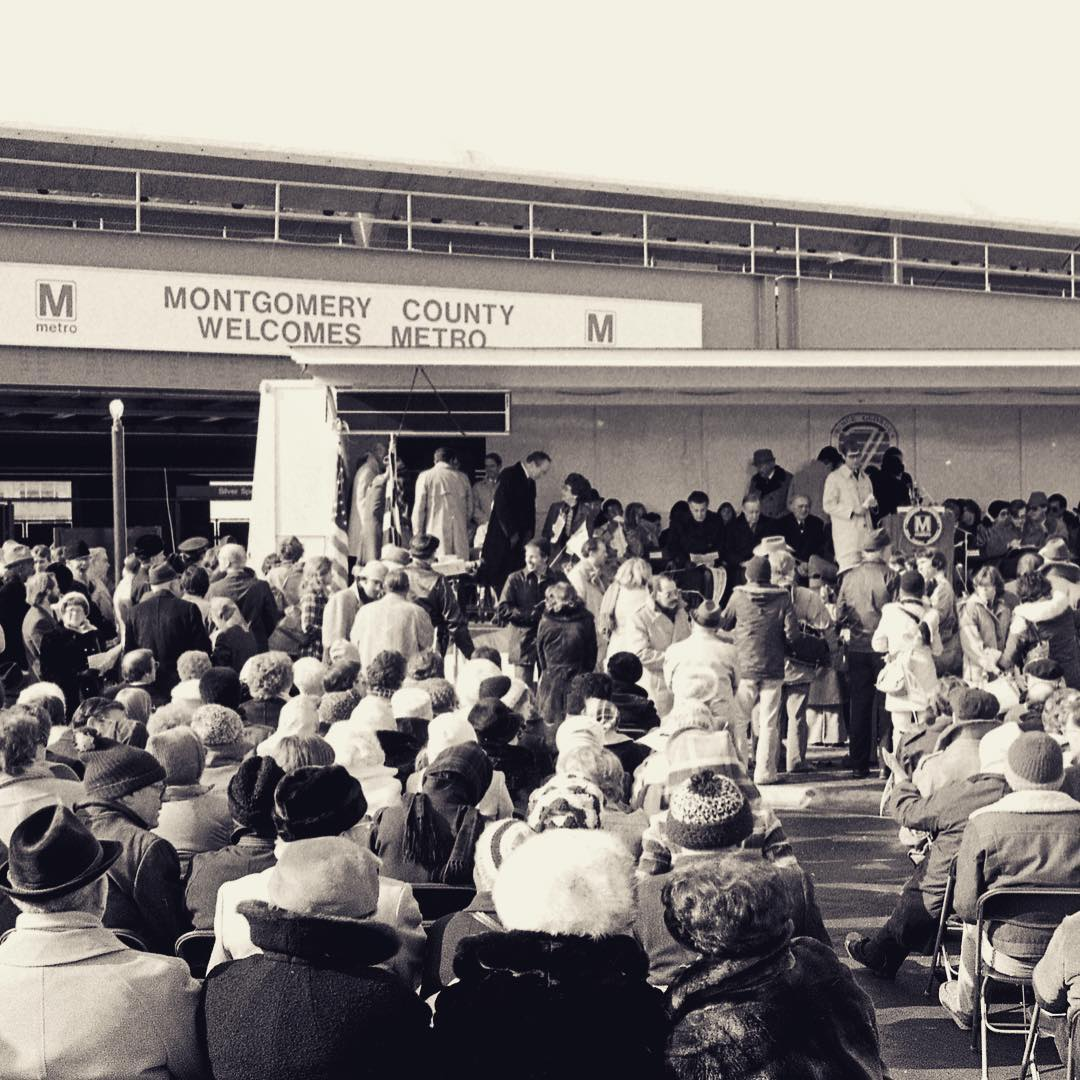
Opening ceremony of the Red Line extension to Shady Grove

The station opened on December 15, 1984 as part of a 7-mile (11 km), four-station northwestern extension of the Red Line between Grosvenor–Strathmore and Shady Grove stations. In 1967, during the initial planning for the Washington Metro, nearby Rockville, not Shady Grove. was considered for the western terminus of the Red Line, with a potential extension to Germantown also considered. There used to be a station called Derwood nearby on the Metropolitan Subdivision.

In 1996, this station was the site of the Washington Metro's second fatal accident when a train arriving at the station overshot the platform and collided with a parked train awaiting assignment, killing the operator of the moving train. The Washington Post reported that the striking train was two months overdue for scheduled brake maintenance. A degradation of brake performance could have played a role in the crash. The crash, which occurred during the Blizzard of 1996, was caused by a failure in the train's Automatic Train Control system.

In 2011, as part of a preliminary study, the WMATA examined the possibility of extending the Red Line past the Shady Grove station and to the Metropolitan Grove station by 2040.

From September 11, 2021, to January 16, 2022, this station was closed due to the Rockville Canopy Replacement Project at Rockville station.

== Station layout ==
The station has one island platform located west of the CSX Metropolitan Subdivision tracks, which carry Amtrak and MARC Trains. There is extensive parking available at this station: a surface lot to the west, and two garages and two surface lots to the east. Access between the platform and parking areas is provided by underpass, located at ground level on the east side and a short escalator below ground level on the west side. Each side of the station also contains a small kiss and ride lot.
