= Maryland Route 655 =

State highway in Maryland, United States

Maryland Route 655

Route information
- Maintained by MDSHA
- Length: 1.86 mi (2.99 km)
- Existed: 1981–present

Major junctions
- West end: MD 28 at Norbeck
- MD 115 at Norbeck
- South end: Carrolton Road near Norbeck

Location
- Country: United States
- State: Maryland
- Counties: Montgomery

Highway system
- Maryland highway system; Interstate; US; State; Scenic Byways
← MD 652	→ MD 656

Maryland Route 655 (MD 655) is a state highway in the U.S. state of Maryland. The unsigned highway runs 1.86 miles (2.99 km) from MD 28 east and south to Carrolton Road in the Norbeck area of eastern Montgomery County. MD 655 is an L-shaped route with east–west and north–south segments that parallel MD 28 and MD 97, respectively. The highway and its auxiliary routes form parts of service roads along MD 28 and MD 97. The route follows what were two of the original state roads constructed in the early 1910s. MD 655 was assigned to the north–south segment when MD 97 was relocated in the late 1960s. The highway was extended west when MD 28 was relocated in the early 1980s.

== Route description ==
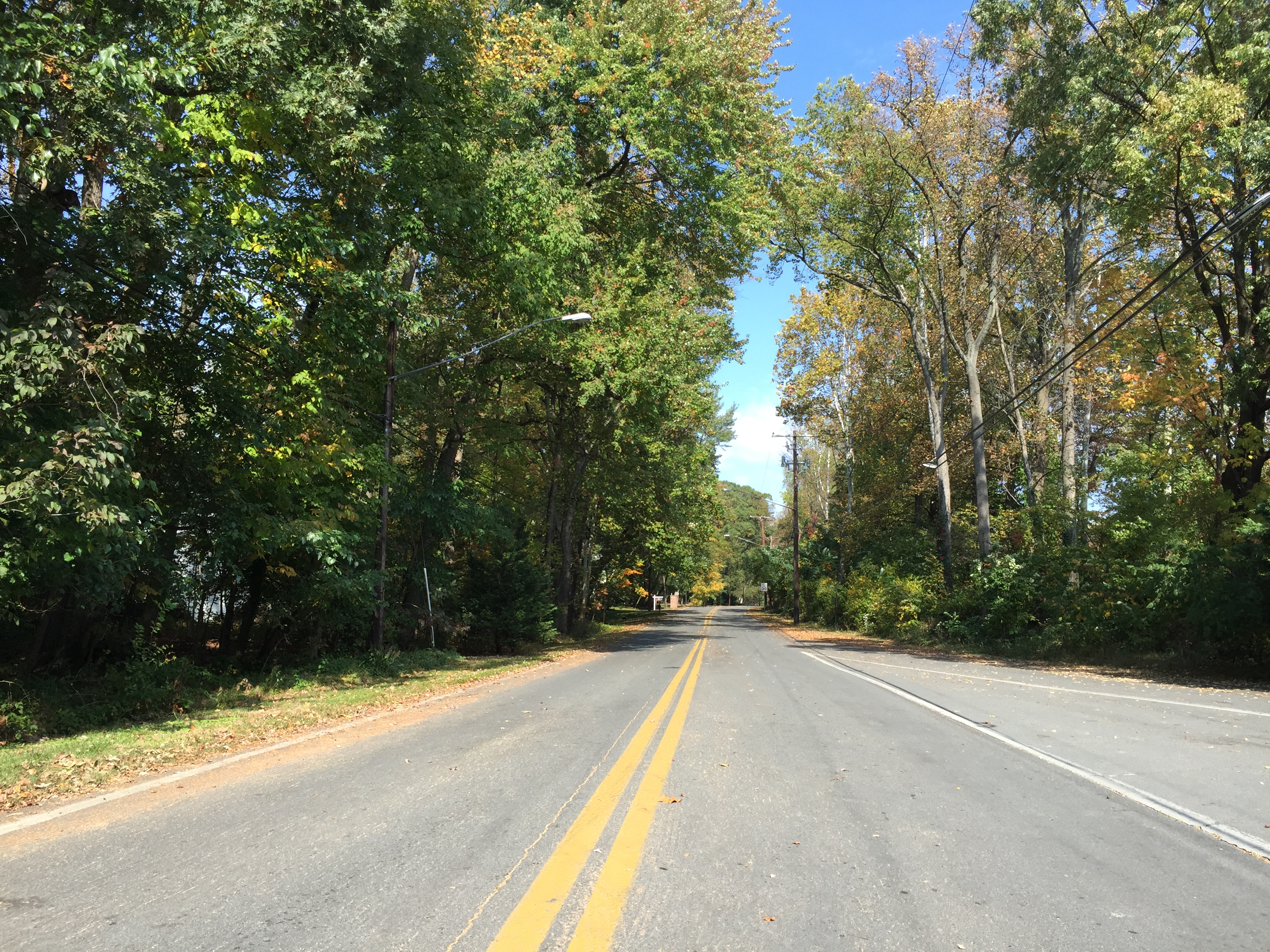
View north along MD 655 at Carrolton Road near Norbeck

MD 655 begins at a ramp from eastbound MD 28 (Norbeck Road) just east of Carrolton Road. The highway heads east as Old MD 28, a one-lane road that closely parallels the eastbound direction of MD 28, with the two roads separated by a row of trees. MD 655 has two ramps to MD 28 and another ramp to the major highway. MD 655 veers away from MD 28 just west of both highways' intersections with MD 115 (Muncaster Mill Road). At the MD 655–MD 115 intersection, which serves as MD 115's eastern terminus, MD 655 becomes two-way. The highway continues east until it is adjacent to the MD 28–MD 97 intersection. There, the highway turns south to parallel the southbound lanes of MD 97 (Georgia Avenue), separated by two rows of trees. MD 655 very briefly has a center left-turn lane between Rosecroft Road and Rossmoor Boulevard, which provides access to MD 97 and Leisure World. The highway veers away from MD 97 but continues to parallel the major highway to its terminus at Carrolton Road. The roadway continues beyond a guardrail that restricts traffic to the three houses beyond before the pavement ends just north of Bel Pre Road.

== History ==
Norbeck Road west of Norbeck and the Seventh Street Pike, which later became an extension of Georgia Avenue, were included in the original state road system developed by the Maryland State Roads Commission in 1909. Norbeck Road from the old turnpike west toward Rockville was under construction in 1911 and completed in 1912. The Seventh Street Pike was built through Norbeck in 1914. Both highways were constructed as 14-foot-wide (4.3 m) macadam roads. Between 1924 and 1926, both highways were expanded to 20 feet (6.1 m) with a pair of 3-foot-wide (0.91 m) concrete shoulders. Norbeck Road and the Seventh Street Pike from Norbeck toward Olney were designated MD 28 in 1927. The Seventh Street Pike was designated MD 97 by 1933 and the MD 28 designation was truncated at Norbeck by 1946. In 1966, a new highway was constructed directly to the east of the MD 97 from Carrolton Road to just north of MD 28. By 1972, MD 97 was moved to the new roadway and MD 655 was assigned to the old section of Georgia Avenue. MD 97 was expanded to a divided highway from just north of Bel Pre Road to just north of MD 28 in 1981. MD 28 itself was expanded to a divided highway, with some relocation of the mainline and addition of service roads, from Baltimore Road east to MD 97 in 1983. MD 655 was extended west along the old alignment of MD 28 as a service road. The highway was named Old MD 28 by 1999, despite most of the highway never having been part of MD 28.

== Junction list ==
The entire route is in Norbeck, Montgomery County.

mi	km	Destinations	Notes
0.00	0.00	MD 28 (Norbeck Road)	Western terminus; MD 655 begins one-way eastbound
0.56	0.90	MD 115 west (Muncaster Mill Road) to MD 28	MD 655 becomes two-way
1.86	2.99	Carrolton Road west	Southern terminus
1.000 mi = 1.609 km; 1.000 km = 0.621 mi

== Auxiliary routes ==
MD 655 has eight unsigned auxiliary routes, all of which have existed since at least 1999.

- MD 655A is the designation for an unnamed 0.49 miles (0.79 km) highway that parallels the southbound side of MD 97 from MD 28 to MD 97 at its partial cloverleaf interchange with MD 200 (Intercounty Connector). The two-lane road begins at an intersection with westbound MD 28, heads north, then turns east, then turns north again to closely parallel MD 97. MD 655A becomes one-way northbound at Thistlebridge Drive. The highway veers away from MD 97, then turns east at a park and ride facility serving MTA Maryland commuter buses and ends at MD 97. The east leg of the intersection is a ramp to eastbound MD 200. MD 655A formerly had a length of 0.82 miles (1.32 km), was entirely two-lanes, and had a cul-de-sac at its northern end. In 2004, the highway was shortened to 0.52 miles (0.84 km) and made one-way north of Thistlebridge Drive, with a terminus at MD 97. MD 655A was shortened again and its northern terminus placed in its present form in 2010 in conjunction with MD 200 construction.
- MD 655B is the designation for Old MD 28, which runs 0.38 miles (0.61 km) from a ramp from eastbound MD 28 just east of Westbury Road to Carrolton Road just south of MD 28. MD 655B is one-lane eastbound and includes a pair of intermediate ramps to and from eastbound MD 28.
- MD 655C is the designation for Old MD 28, which runs 0.28 miles (0.45 km) from a ramp from eastbound MD 28 just east of Bel Pre Road to Westbury Road. MD 655C is one-lane eastbound and has no intermediate ramps.
- MD 655D is the designation for Norbeck Road, which runs 0.29 miles (0.47 km) between a pair of cul-de-sacs parallel to westbound MD 28 on either side of Hannans Way. The 0.01-mile (0.016 km) segment on the west end and the 0.02-mile (0.032 km) segment on the east end are state maintained; the portion in the middle is maintained by Montgomery County.
- MD 655E is the unnamed 0.02-mile (0.032 km) ramp from westbound MD 28 to a service road that parallels the highway from just west of Emory Lane to Rocking Spring Drive.
- MD 655F is the unnamed 0.01-mile (0.016 km) ramp from westbound MD 28 to a service road that parallels the highway from just west of Rocking Spring Drive to Bauer Drive.
- MD 655G is the unnamed 0.01-mile (0.016 km) two-way ramp from eastbound MD 28 to a service road that parallels the highway west of Nadine Drive. The ramp also provides access to a church.
- MD 655H is the unnamed 0.01-mile (0.016 km) ramp from eastbound MD 28 to a service road that parallels the highway from just east of Nadine Drive to Bel Pre Road.
