= National Highway 367 (India) =

National highway in India

National Highway 367
- Map of National Highway 367 in red

Route information
- Length: 157 km (98 mi)

Major junctions
- From: Bhanapur
- To: Gadankeri

Location
- Country: India
- Primary destinations: Kukunur – Yelburga – Gajendragad – Badami – Guledagudda – Bagalkot

Highway system
- Roads in India; Expressways; National; State; Asian
| ← NH 67 | → NH 52 |

National Highway 367 commonly called NH 367 is a National Highway in India. It is a spur road of National Highway 67. NH-367 traverses the state of Karnataka in India.

== Route ==
Bhanpur – Kukunur – Yelburga – Gajendragad – Badami – Guledagudda – Bagalkot – Gaddankeri.

== Junctions ==
Terminal with National Highway 67 near Bhanpur.

Terminal with National Highway 52 near Gaddankeri.

== See also ==
- List of national highways in India
- List of national highways in India by state
