= List of highways numbered 369 =

The following highways are numbered 369:

== Brazil ==
- BR-369

== Canada ==
- Quebec Route 369
- Saskatchewan Highway 369

== India ==
- National Highway 369 (India)

== Japan ==
- Japan National Route 369

== United States ==
- Interstate 369 (Texas)
- Interstate 369 (Kentucky) (proposed)
- Florida State Road 369 (unsigned designation for U.S. Route 319)
- Georgia State Route 369
- New York State Route 369
- Ohio State Route 369
- Puerto Rico Highway 369
- Tennessee State Route 369
- Texas State Highway Loop 369
- Virginia State Route 369

Preceded by 368	Lists of highways 369	Succeeded by 370
