= List of highways numbered 373 =

The following highways are numbered 373:

== International ==
- European route E373

== Brazil ==
- BR-373

== Canada ==
- Manitoba Provincial Road 373
- Quebec Route 373
- Saskatchewan Highway 373

== Japan ==
- Japan National Route 373

== United States ==
- Arizona State Route 373
- Florida State Road 373
- Georgia State Route 373 (former)
- Maryland Route 373
- Nevada State Route 373
- New York State Route 373
- Ohio State Route 373
- Puerto Rico Highway 373
- Farm to Market Road 373
- Virginia State Route 373
- Wyoming Highway 373

Preceded by 372	Lists of highways 373	Succeeded by 374
