= List of highways numbered 371 =

The following highways are numbered 371:

== International ==
- European route E371

== Canada ==
- Newfoundland and Labrador Route 371
- Quebec Route 371
- Saskatchewan Highway 371

== Japan ==
- Japan National Route 371

== United States ==
- U.S. Route 371
  - U.S. Route 371 (1930s) (former)
- Arkansas Highway 371 (former)
- California State Route 371
- Colorado State Highway 371
- Florida State Road 371
- Georgia State Route 371
- Maryland Route 371
- Minnesota State Highway 371
  - Minnesota State Highway 371 Business
- Missouri Route 371
- New York State Route 371
- Ohio State Route 371
- Pennsylvania Route 371
- Puerto Rico Highway 371
- Tennessee State Route 371
- Texas State Highway Spur 371
- Virginia State Route 371
- Wyoming Highway 371

| Preceded by 370 | Lists of highways 371 | Succeeded by 372 |
