= Autovía A-374 =

Highway in Spain

Coordinates: 36.7743°N 5.2282°W

The Autovía A-374 is a highway in Spain. It passes through Andalusia between the provinces of Cádiz and Málaga.
