= Middlebrook Road =

County highway in Montgomery County, Maryland, US

Route information
- Maintained by Montgomery County Department of Transportation
- Length: 3.01 mi (4.84 km)

Major junctions
- South end: Father Hurley Boulevard in Germantown
- MD 118 in Germantown; MD 119 in Germantown; I-270 in Germantown; MD 355 in Germantown
- North end: Midcounty Highway in Germantown

Location
- Country: United States
- State: Maryland
- County: Montgomery

Highway system
- County Roads in Montgomery County

Middlebrook Road is a county highway in Montgomery County in the U.S. state of Maryland. The highway runs 3.01 miles (4.84 km) from Father Hurley Boulevard east to Midcounty Highway within Germantown. Middlebrook Road is a four- to six-lane arterial running east–west through Germantown, providing access to all of the unincorporated town's north–south highways, including Maryland Route 118, MD 119, MD 355, and Interstate 270 (I-270). Middlebrook Road has existed since the early 20th century. The county highway was paved between MD 118 and MD 355 by the 1950s. Middlebrook Road was extended west in the late 1970s and east on a new course from its new interchange with I-270 in the early 1990s. The highway was expanded to a divided highway west of I-270 in the 1990s and early 2000s.

== Route description ==
Middlebrook Road begins at Father Hurley Boulevard in the unincorporated town of Germantown. The county highway heads southeast as a four-lane divided highway. Middlebrook Road expands to six lanes at its intersection with MD 118 (Germantown Road). The highway curves east as it passes Seneca Valley High School and meets the northern end of MD 119 (Great Seneca Highway). Middlebrook Road descends into the valley of Gunners Branch of Great Seneca Creek and passes an entrance to a U.S. Department of Energy campus opposite its intersection with Waring Station Road. The highway has a partial interchange with I-270 (Eisenhower Memorial Highway) featuring ramps to and from the direction of Washington. Middlebrook Road continues northeast past Holy Cross Hospital Germantown to an intersection with MD 355 (Frederick Road) near the hamlet of Middlebrook. The county highway continues east as a two-lane road on a wide right of way with road stubs at each intersection on the unused right of way. Middlebrook Road ends where it curves south onto an isolated section of Midcounty Highway on the edge of Great Seneca Stream Valley Park.

Middlebrook Road is maintained by the Montgomery County Department of Transportation. The county highway is a part of the National Highway System from Father Hurley Boulevard to MD 355. In an average day of traffic in 2022, Middlebrook Road had a maximum volume of 28,922 vehicles between I-270 and MD 355 and a minimum volume of 9,744 vehicles between MD 355 and Midcounty Highway.

== History ==
Middlebrook Road is named for Middlebrook, a village established in the early 19th century on the Frederick Road on high ground above mills at the Frederick Road's crossing of Great Seneca Creek. The Middlebrook Road was established in the early 20th century between the Germantown Road and the Frederick Road. The county highway was laid out rudimentarily between 1893 and 1908, branching from the Frederick Road near its intersection with Blunt Road. As of 1944, Middlebrook Road remained a dirt road, and it was paved with a light-duty surface by the mid-1950s. When the Washington National Pike freeway (I-270) was constructed across Middlebrook Road between 1954 and 1956. At the time, no interchange was constructed between the two highways. However, stretches of Middlebrook Road and adjacent roads on both sides of the freeway were slightly relocated, including Waring Station Road, which then met Middlebrook Road immediately to the west of the freeway overpass. Several sections of Middlebrook Road between MD 118 and the freeway were relocated and improved by 1972.

By 1979, Middlebrook Road had been extended west to its present terminus at Father Hurley Boulevard; a short stretch of that boulevard on either side of Middlebrook Road had been built with two lanes. Between 1987 and 1989, Middlebrook Road was expanded to a divided highway from MD 118 to Great Seneca Highway, the first piece of which had been built in the same time span. By 1991, the portion of Middlebrook Road west of MD 118 had been expanded to a divided highway, as well as the adjacent part of Father Hurley Boulevard. I-270 was reconstructed and expanded through the Middlebrook Road area starting in 1989, and its interchange with Middlebrook Road was completed by 1991. By 1993, Middlebrook Road was four lanes from Father Hurley Boulevard to Great Seneca Highway and through the I-270 interchange. The highway had been relocated to its present course as a six-lane divided highway between I-270 and MD 355 and extended east to its current terminus on one half of the right of way. Part of the old road west from MD 355 later became Gunners Branch Road. Middlebrook Road was expanded from four to six lanes between MD 118 and MD 119 by 1998. That same year, the highway was under construction between MD 119 and I-270. Middlebrook Road's expansion to six lanes from MD 119 to I-270 was complete by 2002.

== Junction list ==
The entire route is in Germantown, Montgomery County.

mi	km	Destinations	Notes
0.00	0.00	Father Hurley Boulevard	Western terminus
0.51	0.82	MD 118 (Germantown Road) to I-270	
0.94	1.51	MD 119 south (Great Seneca Highway) – Gaithersburg	
1.76	2.83	I-270 south (Eisenhower Memorial Highway) – Washington	I-270 Exit 13; no access from Middlebrook Road to northbound I-270 or from southbound I-270 to Middlebrook Road
2.38	3.83	MD 355 (Frederick Road) – Clarksburg, Gaithersburg	
3.01	4.84	Midcounty Highway	Eastern terminus
1.000 mi = 1.609 km; 1.000 km = 0.621 mi
