= Kukunur =

Kukunur Кукунур
- Village
- Location within Irkutsk Oblast Location within Russia
- Coordinates: 53°11′N 102°30′E
- Country: Russia
- Region: Irkutsk Oblast
- District: Alarsky District
- Time zone: UTC+8:00

Kukunur (Russian: Кукунур) is a rural locality (a village) in Alarsky District, Irkutsk Oblast, Russia. Population: 133 (2010 census);

== Geography ==
This rural locality is located 26 kilometres (16 mi) from Kutulik (the district's administrative centre), 154 kilometres (96 mi) from Irkutsk (capital of Irkutsk Oblast) and 4,333 kilometres (2,692 mi) from Moscow. Gotop is the nearest rural locality.
