= Washington Grove, Maryland =

Historic district in Maryland, United States

- Town
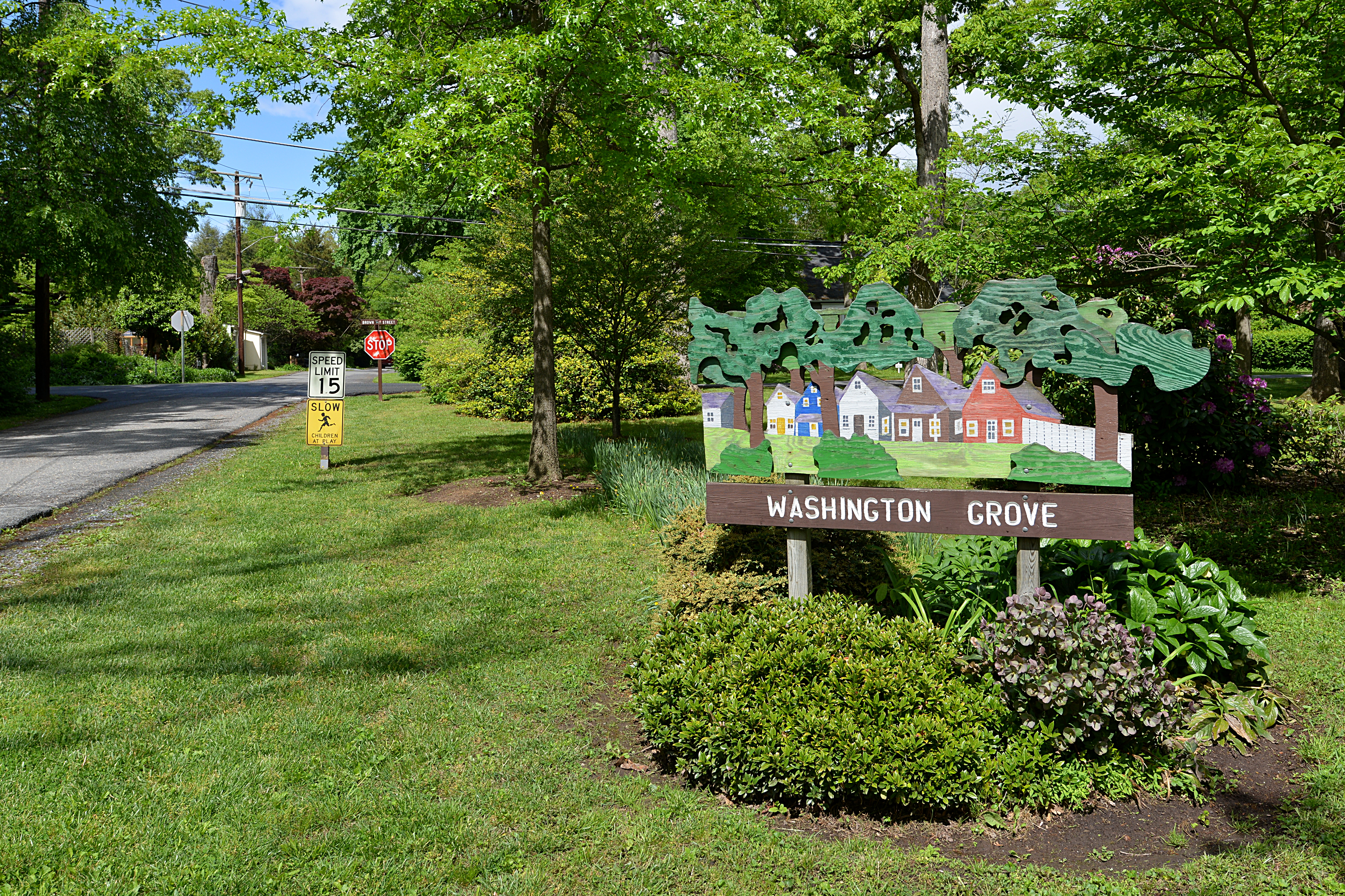
- The Washington Grove welcome sign

- Logo
- Motto: "A Town Within a Forest"
- Location of Washington Grove in Montgomery County and Maryland
- Coordinates: 39°08′27″N 77°10′28″W
- Country: United States
- State: Maryland
- County: Montgomery
- Founded: July 29, 1874
- Incorporated: March 26, 1937

Government
  - Mayor: John Compton

Area
  - Total: 0.34 sq mi (0.88 km^{2})
  - Land: 0.34 sq mi (0.87 km^{2})
  - Water: 0 sq mi (0.00 km^{2})
- Elevation: 525 ft (160 m)

Population (2020)
  - Total: 505
  - Density: 1,501.4/sq mi (579.69/km^{2})
- Time zone: UTC-5 (Eastern (EST))
  - Summer (DST): UTC-4 (EDT)
- ZIP code: 20880
- Area codes: 301, 240
- FIPS code: 24-81675
- GNIS feature ID: 2391472
- Website: www.washingtongrovemd.org

- Washington Grove Historic District
- U.S. National Register of Historic Places
- U.S. Historic district
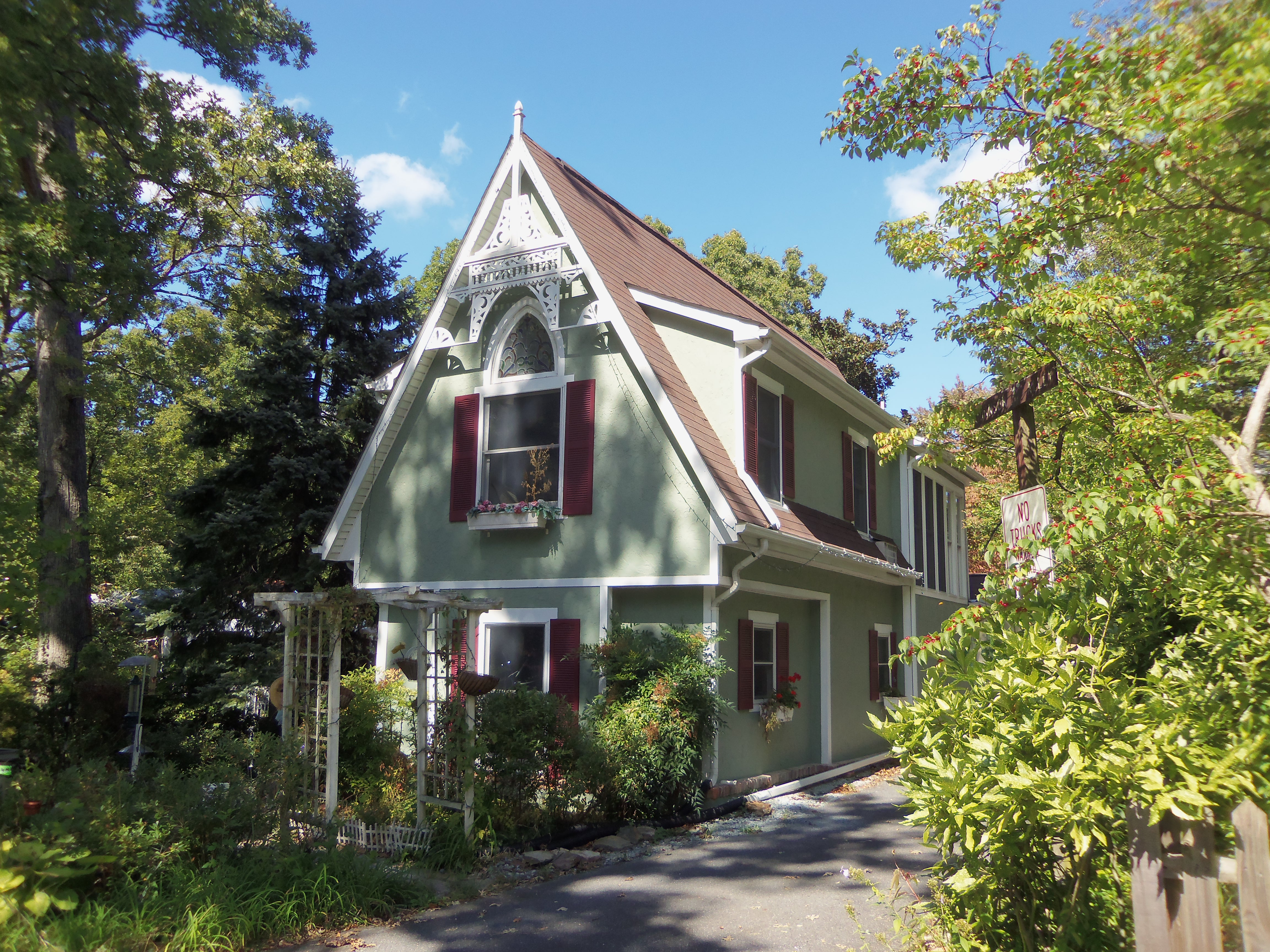
- The Washington Grove Historic District in September 2012

- Location within Maryland Location within the United States
- Location: Washington Grove, Maryland
- Coordinates: 39°8′24″N 77°10′28″W
- Built: 1873
- Architectural style: Late Gothic Revival
- NRHP reference No.: 80001829 (original); 100005640 (increase)

Significant dates
- Added to NRHP: April 9, 1980
- Boundary increase: September 28, 2020

Washington Grove is a town in Montgomery County, Maryland, United States. The population was 505 at the 2020 census. The Washington Grove Historic District was listed on the National Register of Historic Places in 1980.

== History ==
=== Indigenous occupation ===
The land where the residential community of Washington Grove now stands, and all of Montgomery County, was traveled and inhabited by indigenous people from around 10,000 BCE. Members of the Massawomeck, Susquehannock, Senaca (Iroquois), and Piscataway-Conoy tribes lived in the area, primarily using the land as crossover territory toward rock shelters, encampments and sizable villages near the Potomac River. Tribal boundaries were fluid.

=== Colonization by Europeans ===
A group of Methodists began the tradition of having camp meetings in the area circa 1800. Camp meetings were a tradition where a group of Methodists would gather in a forest clearing to worship and socialize. Benches were arranged in a circle or oval with an elevated preachers' stand in the middle. Tents surrounded the area, along with carriages and wagons behind them. Services lasted well into the night. The camp meetings provided cultural and spiritual improvement to those who attended.

In 1873, a committee from the Foundry Methodist Church, located at 14th and G streets NW in Washington, D.C., began a search for a permanent location to hold annual camp meetings. They wanted a location with sufficient space for thousands of attendees, a supply of clean water, and a shaded location to provide relief from the summer sun. They wanted the location to be less than a day's trip from Washington, and protection from the sale of liquor, because Methodists did not believe in drinking alcohol.

In June 1873, John T. Mitchell, Richard Willett, F. Howard, W.R. Woodward, E.F. Simpson, Mr. Worthington, Thomas P. Morgan, B. Peyton Brown, and a few others purchased 267.5 acres (1.1 km^{2}) of land from the widow of farmer Nathan Cooke for $6,636.25. The land was given to the Washington Grove Meeting Association, which had been recently incorporated on March 30, 1874.

A person could build a cottage on the land by purchasing five shares of stock for twenty dollars per share. The first share had to be purchased with cash, while the other four could be financed at an annual interest rate of six percent. Alternatively, a tent could be rented for between $9 and $15. There were two dining courts, and a market would provided fresh meat and produce. The center of the camp was originally named The Plaza and later The Symbolic Circle, and there were six numbered avenues radiating from it. Tents were arranged in a grid along avenues named for participating churches. Families would stay over to attend a two-week-long meeting of the Methodist Episcopal churches of the District of Columbia. Named Washington Grove Camp, the first camp meeting began on August 5, 1874, with 240 tents.

In 1877, a tabernacle with a belfry for a bell was built in the center of the circle. The bell called people to prayer, and it was also rung at the end of the camp meeting. The tabernacle was a large open-air chapel that could seat 500 worshipers. In addition to religious services, lecturers spoke on such topics as women's suffrage and the problem of poverty in cities.

The Maryland legislature gave camp-meeting managers control of all land within a two-mile radius of a meeting site in order to prohibit businesses from opening nearby. The camp-meeting managers used this power to prohibit the sale of alcoholic beverages anywhere on the grounds. While entertaining programs were allowed, card playing, theater going, and dancing were all banned. In 1879, they voted to prohibit the selling of anything at all on Sundays. The Barrett Brothers, who operated the camp store, asked for an exception to sell ice cream and sandwiches on Sundays, but their request was denied.

Reverend William Burns of Dumbarton Methodist Church built the first cottage in 1878. By 1879, seventeen cottages had been built, each with green and white exteriors and large porches, surrounding a large tabernacle. The cottages peaked roofs resembled that of the original tents, and the architectural style was Carpenter Gothic, which was fashionable at the time. The round-trip train fare between the District and Washington Grove was eighty cents in 1879.

In 1879, the trustees voted to borrow $4,000 in order to build a hotel on the western area of the grounds. Completed in 1881, the hotel was three stories in the center and two stories in the wings. It had 23 sleeping rooms, a parlor, a dining room, and a kitchen. The cost to build the hotel came in under the $4,000 budget. Building of a chapel to hold 800 people began in 1889.

In 1880, the Washington Grove Camp Meeting Association decided that a hotel was needed. To build the hotel, they chose Wash Williams, a furniture store owner. The Albany Hotel had big porches, a large dining room, a barber shop, and a small store. Rooms cost between $6 and $7 per week, and dinner cost fifty cents. During the same year, rules were established protecting existing trees when cottages and streets were built.

In order to accommodate larger groups of people, an auditorium with seating for 1,400 people was built in Woodward Park in 1905. The auditorium symbolically moved away from the Sacred Circle. Admission to the wholesome entertainment cost $2 per adult and $1 per child for the season. Some of the entertainment included musical programs, educational lectures, and spelling bees. Religious services were held at the auditorium as well. As the auditorium increasingly became the center of life at the camp, the old Tabernacle was torn down.

Because the land was owned by the Washington Grove Camp Meeting Association, it had complete control over who purchased and leased the plots. In the early 20th century, the Washington Grove Camp Association, and later the Town of Washington Grove, placed restrictive covenants in deeds and leases in order to prevent African Americans from buying, renting, or leasing land in Washington Grove. This is exemplified in one of many deeds, such as one dating from 1925 that reads,

That whereas the death rate of persons of African descent is much greater than the death rate of persons of the white race and affects injuriously the health of the town and village communities, and as the permanent location of persons of African descent in such places as owners or tenants constitutes and irreparable injury to the value and usefulness of real estate in the interest of public health and to prevent irreparable injury to the grantor or its successors and assigns, and the owners of adjacent real estate, the grantees, their heirs and assigns, hereby covenant, and agree with the grantor, its successors and assigns, that they will not sell, conveyor rent the premises hereby conveyed, the whole or any part thereof, or any structure thereon, to any person of African descent.

A Black Methodist camp was founded in 1864 as Emory Grove, that predated Washington Grove. Less than a mile separated the two towns, and many of the residents of Emory Grove worked for the residents of Washington Grove. The superintendent of the Washington Grove grounds was a resident of Emory Grove named William A. Scott. Following an incident in 1892 where an Emory Grove native, Jessie Lancaster, ransacked homes in Washington Grove, William A. Scott was forced out. Subsequently, in 1897 the gates to Washington Grove were closed, thus preventing anyone from walking through Washington Grove. This closing severely hindered the ability of Emory Grove residents to reach the train stop on the other side of Washington Grove.

=== Twentieth century ===
Eventually, people began to live in the area year-round. In 1910, the church formed a year-round congregation. By the 1920s, the Washington Grove Camp Meeting Association began selling portions of land, slowly replacing the 99-year leases. By 1924, camp meetings were no longer held.

The Great Depression affected the area significantly. The Washington Grove Camp Meeting Association had a difficult time paying its bills, it cut back on its insurance, and at one point it needed a donation to pay the community's electricity bill. Because some residents could no longer afford vacation homes, some of the homes were rented out while others stood vacant and neglected.

By 1934, the Washington Grove Camp Meeting Association recognized that the area had dramatically changed since its founding. Some residents wanted the area to be annexed to the town of Gaithersburg. Reorganization committees met for several years to determine a plan for the future of the community. In 1937, the Washington Grove Camp Meeting Association was dissolved; the Maryland Legislature incorporated the community as a town on March 26, 1937. Maryland Governor Harry Nice signed the town's charter into law on May 18, 1937. On July 10, 1937, the town held an election where it chose its first mayor and six members of the town council. Irving L. McCathran was elected the town's first mayor. He served as mayor for twenty years.

By the late 1940s, Washington Grove began to look run down. Assembly Hall was in poor condition, the parks were unkempt, and many cottages so dilapidated that they were torn down. There was too little money to maintain the Auditorium, and it was demolished. The surrounding farms in Gaithersburg were beginning to be sold to developers, changing the surrounding area and putting pressure on the town to change dramatically. In 1955, the Town of Washington Grove obtained zoning and planning powers in order to control future growth.

In 1975, a master plan was written in order to retain the existing historic nature of the town. The town applied for National Register of Historic Places status in 1979, and it was approved the following year.

=== Today ===
The original layout of small houses fronting grassy walkways was preserved in the center of town, with vehicular access via paved streets leading to the backs of the houses. Houses built more recently do not front the walkways, but preserve a Grove flavor by the variety of architectural styles resulting from their being constructed one at a time in various styles rather than in tracts.

More than half of the town is publicly owned. The East Woods and West Woods, designated as wildlife sanctuaries, are the only municipality-owned forests in Maryland. The many walkways and parks are popular not only with residents but also with people from neighboring communities. On a fine evening, the walkways hum with people and cats strolling, walking dogs, and chatting. Residents meet for musical picnics at the Gazebo, town meetings in McCathran Hall, and summer days swimming in Maple Lake, the Town's swimming hole in the West Woods. Other town activities include the Summer in the Parks program for children, a book club, a movie club, and the Mousetrap series of concerts.

In 2013, Preservation Maryland placed Washington Grove on its list of threatened historic properties.

== Geography ==
Washington Grove is located in central Montgomery County at 39°8′22″N 77°10′33″W (39.139535, -77.175926). It is bordered to the west by the town of Gaithersburg, and to the northeast and southeast by unincorporated Redland. Rockville, the Montgomery county seat, is 4 miles (6 km) to the south, and downtown Washington, D.C., is 19 miles (31 km) to the south-southeast.

According to the U.S. Census Bureau, Washington Grove has a total area of 0.34 square miles (0.88 km^{2}), of which 0.002 square miles (0.005 km^{2}), or 0.59%, are water. The town sits on a ridge that drains northwest to Whetstone Run, a tributary of Great Seneca Creek, and southeast to Mill Creek, a tributary of Rock Creek. Seneca and Rock Creek are south-flowing tributaries of the Potomac River.

== Demographics ==
Historical population
Census	Pop.	Note	%±
1940	160		—
1950	400		150.0%
1960	576		44.0%
1970	688		19.4%
1980	527		−23.4%
1990	434		−17.6%
2000	515		18.7%
2010	555		7.8%
2020	505		−9.0%
U.S. Decennial Census

=== 2010 census ===
As of the census of 2010, there were 555 people, 230 households, and 157 families residing in the town. The population density was 1,585.7 inhabitants per square mile (612.2/km^{2}). There were 242 housing units at an average density of 691.4 per square mile (267.0/km^{2}). The racial makeup of the town was 85.2% White, 4.0% African American, 7.4% Asian, 2.5% from other races, and 0.9% from two or more races. Hispanic or Latino of any race were 5.6% of the population.

There were 230 households, of which 28.7% had children under the age of 18 living with them, 56.1% were married couples living together, 5.7% had a female householder with no husband present, 6.5% had a male householder with no wife present, and 31.7% were non-families. 25.7% of all households were made up of individuals, and 8.7% had someone living alone who was 65 years of age or older. The average household size was 2.41 and the average family size was 2.87.

The median age in the town was 49.7 years. 20.5% of residents were under the age of 18; 4.9% were between the ages of 18 and 24; 15% were from 25 to 44; 46.3% were from 45 to 64; and 13.3% were 65 years of age or older. The gender makeup of the town was 48.8% male and 51.2% female.

=== 2000 census ===
As of the census of 2000, there were 515 people, 208 households, and 143 families residing in the town. The population density was 1,563.8 inhabitants per square mile (603.8/km^{2}). There were 209 housing units at an average density of 634.6 per square mile (245.0/km^{2}). The racial makeup of the town was 94.76% White, 0.39% African American, 0.19% Native American, 0.58% Asian, 2.72% from other races, and 1.36% from two or more races. Hispanic or Latino of any race were 4.08% of the population.

There were 208 households, out of which 33.7% had children under the age of 18 living with them, 62.5% were married couples living together, 4.3% had a female householder with no husband present, and 30.8% were non-families. 23.6% of all households were made up of individuals, and 8.7% had someone living alone who was 65 years of age or older. The average household size was 2.44 and the average family size was 2.91. There is an average of 1.8 cats per family in Washington Grove.

In the town, the population was spread out, with 22.3% under the age of 18, 3.5% from 18 to 24, 25.2% from 25 to 44, 37.9% from 45 to 64, and 11.1% who were 65 years of age or older. The median age was 45 years. For every 100 females, there were 85.3 males. For every 100 females age 18 and over, there were 82.6 males.

The median income for a household in the town was $92,398, and the median income for a family was $97,029. Males had a median income of $70,750 versus $48,125 for females. The per capita income for the town was $38,332. None of the families and 0.8% of the population were living below the poverty line, including no one under eighteen and no one over 64.

== Government ==
Washington Grove is governed by a town council consisting of six elected councilors and a mayor. Elections are held yearly in May, with two councilor positions rotating for election each year. Two council meetings are held each month. Town residents are encouraged to attend, and in one of the two monthly meetings a period of time is set aside for "Public Appearances" in which issues are aired and discussed by town residents urging some action by the council. There is a town meeting yearly in which town residents examine and approve (or ask for changes to) the coming fiscal year's budget. When issues of significant importance are pending, a special town meeting is often called to allow for an exchange of ideas.

Most of the work in keeping the town running, however, is performed by volunteers in committees including the Woods Group, the Recreation Committee, the Lake Committee, the Historic Preservation Committee, and many others. Volunteerism is high, allowing an extraordinarily broad range of activities and events.

Each councilor is liaison to (typically) two town committees, with responsibilities to attend meetings of those committees and report back on their activities. Individual councilors are also responsible for administration of contracts for road maintenance, trash and recycling pickup, tree maintenance, and other ongoing upkeep efforts.

== Education ==
The town is zoned to schools in the Montgomery County Public Schools district.

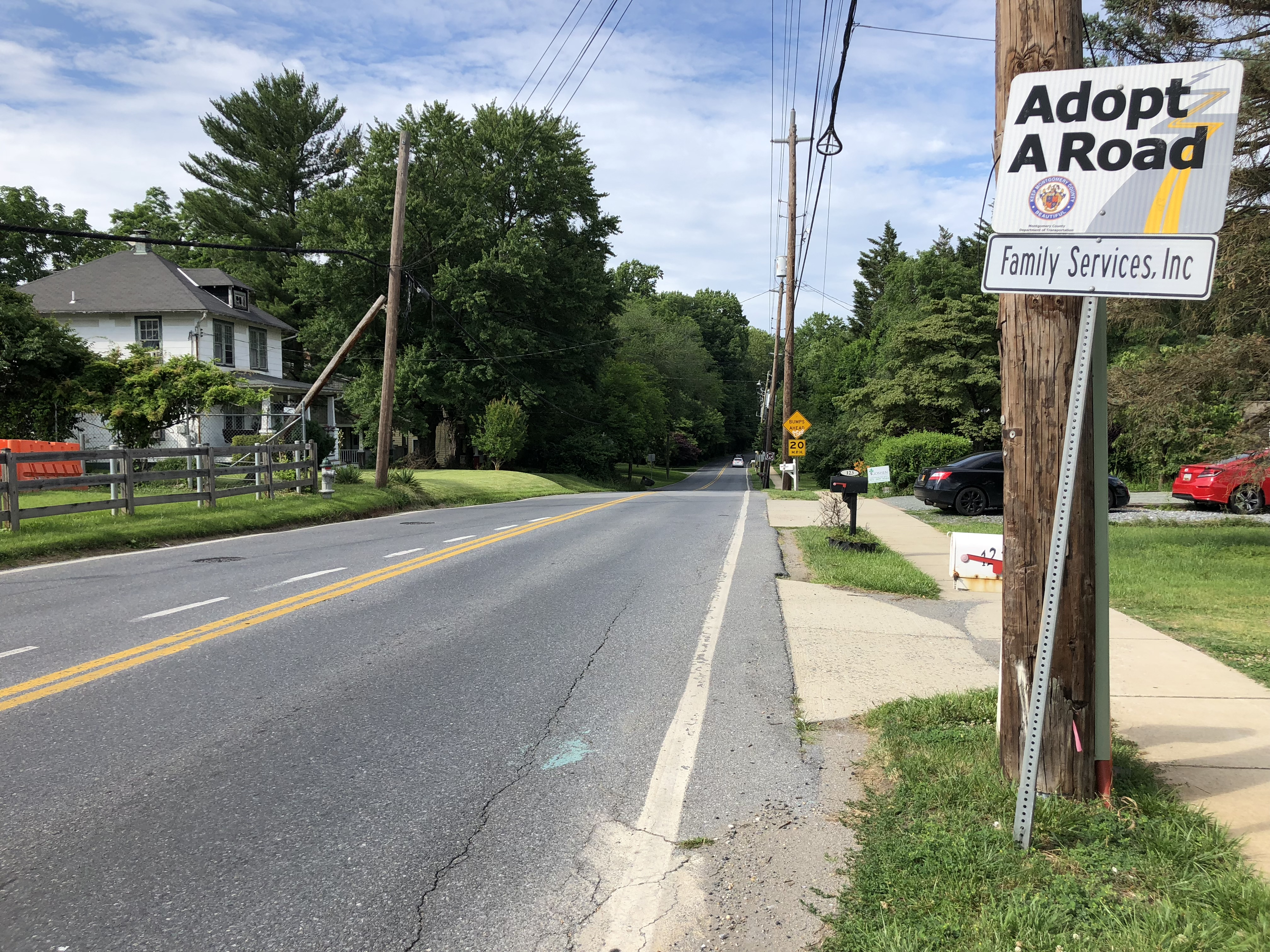
View northeast along Washington Grove Lane as it enters Washington Grove

Zoned schools include:

- Washington Grove Elementary School
- Forest Oak Middle School
- Gaithersburg High School

== Transportation ==
No state highways traverse the town, with the primary road through town being county-maintained Washington Grove Lane. However, major highways are located in the vicinity, including Interstate 370, Interstate 270, and Maryland Route 200.

The Washington Grove station on MARC's Brunswick Line provides commuter service into Washington D.C.
