= Interstate 375 =

Interstate 375 may refer to:

- Interstate 375 (Florida), a spur in St. Petersburg, Florida
- Interstate 375 (Michigan), a spur in Detroit, Michigan
