= Montgomery County Airpark =

Public airport in Montgomery County, Maryland, United States

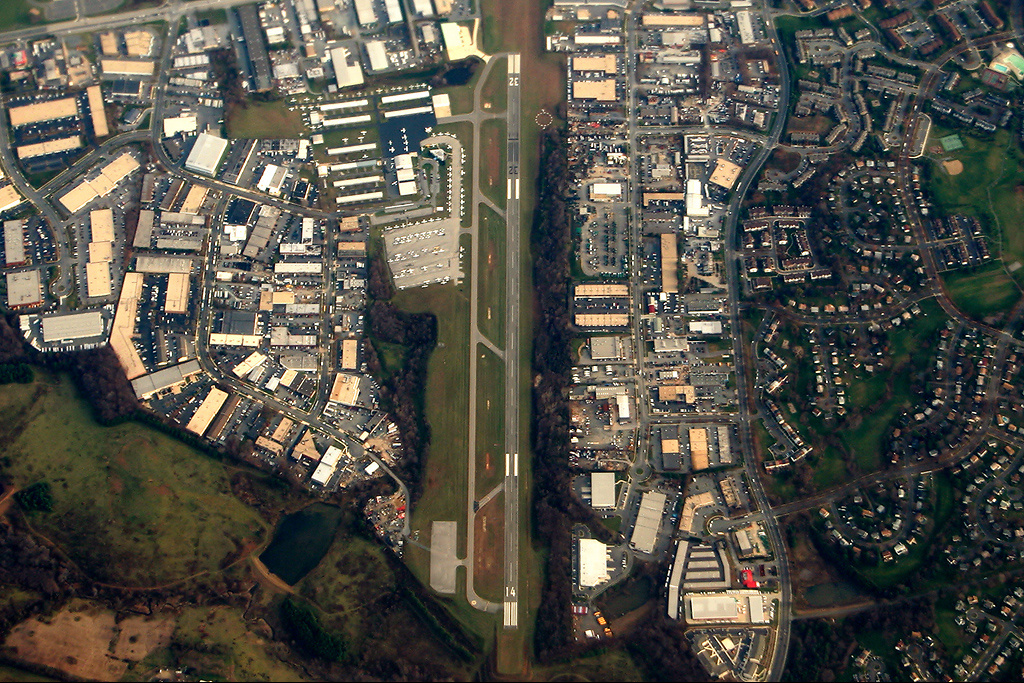
- The Montgomery County Airpark in 2006
- IATA: GAI; ICAO: KGAI; FAA LID: GAI

Summary
- Airport type: Public
- Owner: Montgomery County Revenue Authority
- Location: Gaithersburg, Maryland, U.S.
- Elevation AMSL: 539 ft / 164.3 m
- Coordinates: 39°10′06″N 77°09′57.6″W

Map
- Location of airport in Maryland / United States GAI (the United States)

Runways
Direction	Length		Surface
Direction	ft	m	Surface
14/32	4,202	1,281	Asphalt

Montgomery County Airpark (IATA: GAI, ICAO: KGAI, FAA LID: GAI) is a U.S. public airport located three miles (5 km) northeast of the city of Gaithersburg, in Montgomery County, Maryland, United States.

== History ==
=== 20th century ===
The airport was built by Silver Spring, Maryland developer William E. Richardson in 1960, in an area that was then rural. The original plan was to build an airport, a 9-hole golf course, and a hotel on the 388 acres (1.6 km^{2}) of land. The Montgomery County Planning Board voted 3–2 in favor of rezoning the land to allow the airport to be built. Those in favor on the Board said that Montgomery County "desperately" needed an airport and that the additional industry would help bring in tax revenue, while those opposed said that the airport would destroy the rural aspect of the surrounding area.

Richardson deeded title to the land to Montgomery County, which leased the land back to him to operate the airport. Richardson planned to operate charter flights and an air taxi to National Airport, Friendship Airport in Baltimore, and the soon-to-be-opened Dulles Airport. The airport was dedicated on October 22, 1960. The airport was initially managed by Richardson's son, James E. Richardson, and Richard T. Kreuzburg, a former Capital Airlines pilot.

After having a simple hangar during its first four years of operation, a terminal building was built in 1964.

=== 21st century ===
On July 20, 2001, one of the hijackers in the future September 11 attacks, Hani Hanjour, flew to the Montgomery County Airpark from Fairfield, New Jersey, on a practice flight with fellow hijacker Nawaf Alhazmi.

== Facilities ==
=== Runways ===
Montgomery County Airpark covers 125 acres (51 ha) and has one runway.

- Runway 14/32: 4,202 x 75 ft. (1,281 x 23 m), surface: asphalt (32 - right traffic)

=== Navigational aids ===
- WAAS/GPS/RNAV MDA 262 agl
- VOR 155 degree from FDK 109.0 MDA 600 agl

=== On-field services ===
- RPM Aircraft Service
  - Full service maintenance provider
  - FAA Certified mechanics and inspectors on staff
  - Mooney, Beechcraft, Cheyenne, and Cirrus specialists
- DC Metro Aviation Services
  - Full-service FBO - 100LL JetA
  - Hangar-tiedown rental
- Charter operators
  - Open Air Charters - Part 135
- Flight schools
  - Bravo Flight Training
  - Positive Attitude Aviation
  - Pilot in Training Flight Academy
  - Washington International Flight Academy (WIFA)
- Civil Air Patrol
  - Montgomery Senior Squadron
- Food & beverage
  - Cafe Sophie

== Flying clubs ==
- Congressional Flying Club
- Octopus Flying Club
- Inn Flying Club
- TSS Flying Club
  - TSS Flying Club was formed in 1957 and remains one of the largest flying clubs in the Washington-Baltimore region today. TSS has 65 members and five well equipped aircraft including two Cessna 172 180hp, Cessna 182S, Cessna 182RG, and a Vans RV12 certified light sport aircraft with glass cockpit.

== Accidents and incidents ==
At least 30 plane crashes have occurred at or near Montgomery County Airpark since 1983.

On December 8, 2014, a plane crashed into houses while on approach to Runway 14 at Montgomery County Airpark. Six people died, the three occupants of the plane and three people in the house the plane hit.

On November 27, 2022, a Mooney M20J-201 (N201RF) crashed into a powerline while on approach to Runway 14 at Montgomery County Airpark. Both occupants survived with some injuries but were trapped in the aircraft for several hours.

On August 21, 2025, A Cessna 172S (N505LP) over ran runway 32 and ended up in a ditch at Montgomery County Airpark. All occupants survived with no injuries.

== See also ==
- List of airports in Maryland
