= Interstate 370 =

Highway in Maryland

Interstate 370
- I-370 highlighted in red

Route information
- Auxiliary route of I-70
- Maintained by MDSHA
- Length: 2.54 mi (4.09 km)
- Existed: 1988–present
- NHS: Entire route

Major junctions
- West end: I-270 / Sam Eig Highway in Gaithersburg
- MD 355 in Gaithersburg
- East end: MD 200 in Derwood

Location
- Country: United States
- State: Maryland
- Counties: Montgomery

Highway system
- Interstate Highway System; Main; Auxiliary; Suffixed; Business; Future; Maryland highway system; Interstate; US; State; Scenic Byways
← MD 368	→ MD 370

Interstate 370 (I-370) is a 2.54-mile (4.09 km) Interstate Highway spur route off I-270 in Gaithersburg, Maryland, to the western end of the Maryland Route 200 (MD 200, Intercounty Connector) toll road at an interchange that provides access to the park and ride lot at the Shady Grove station on the Red Line of the Washington Metro. Despite the number, I-370 does not connect to I-70 itself. The road continues to the west of I-270 as Sam Eig Highway, a surface road. Along the way, I-370 has interchanges with MD 355 and Shady Grove Road. The freeway was completed in the late 1980s to connect I-270 to the Shady Grove station. I-370 was always part of the planned Intercounty Connector but was the only segment to be built at the time. The opening of MD 200 east of I-370 resulted in the truncation of I-370 to the interchange with MD 200 and the redesignation of the road leading into the Shady Grove station as MD 200A.

== Route description ==
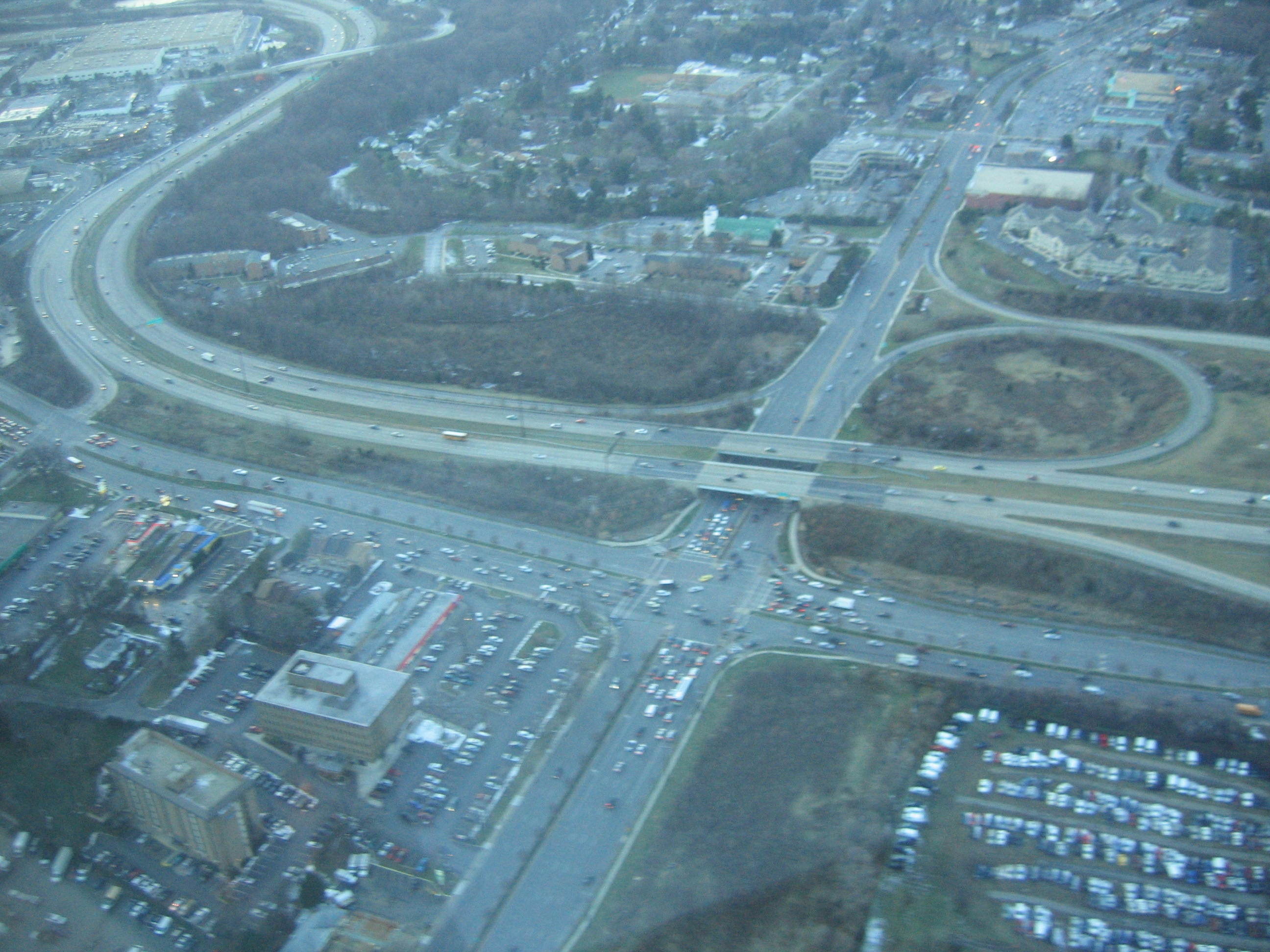
I-370 at MD 355, from top-left to center-right

I-370 begins a short distance to the west of the I-270 interchange in Gaithersburg, Montgomery County, heading northeast as a six-lane freeway. Southwest of this interchange, the road continues as Sam Eig Highway (named after Washington real estate developer Sam Eig) which interchanges with Washingtonian Boulevard before becoming a surface road. The highway passes woods to the northwest and a shopping center to the southeast as it reaches an interchange with I-270. From this point, I-370 turns east and runs between residential neighborhoods to the north and business parks to the south, with trees separating the road from these areas. The freeway curves northeast again and comes to the MD 355 interchange. Past this, the highway passes more commercial development before reaching a bridge over CSX's Metropolitan Subdivision railroad line. A short distance later, I-370 comes to a trumpet interchange with MD 200A, a freeway that provides access to Shady Grove Road and the Shady Grove station of Washington Metro's Red Line. At this point, I-370 ends and the freeway continues east as MD 200 (Intercounty Connector), a toll road.

== History ==
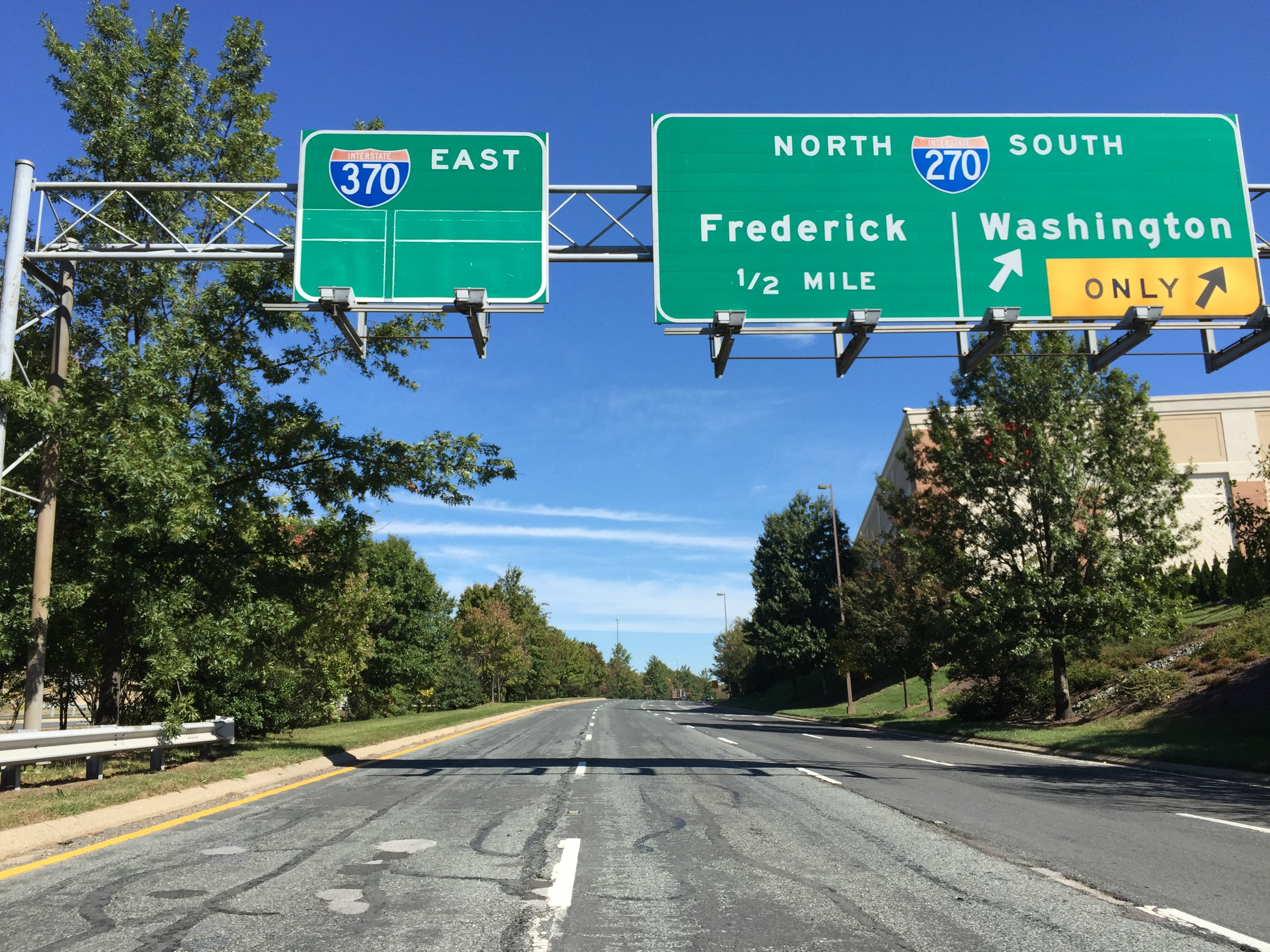
View east at the west end of I-370 at Sam Eig Highway in Gaithersburg

What is now I-370 was originally proposed as part of the Intercounty Connector in the late 1970s. The I-370 freeway opened on December 17, 1988, connecting I-270 to the Shady Grove station. After three and a half years of construction, the freeway was four lanes wide and 2.5 miles (4.0 km) long. Its construction cost $169 million (equivalent to $386 million in 2024), with federal funds paying for 90 percent of the cost. The state of Maryland's portion of the cost was funded with a portion of the proceeds of a $0.05-per-US-gallon ($0.06/imp gal; $0.01/L) gas tax increase in 1987. Prior to its opening, driving from I-270 to the Shady Grove station involved exiting at Shady Grove Road and passing six traffic lights to arrive at the station. Upon its opening, the remainder of the Intercounty Connector was planned but not yet built. At the time, it was the fourth shortest Interstate, after I-878 in New York, I-375 in Detroit, and I-395 in Baltimore.

In 2007, construction began on MD 200, which was to head east from I-370. At this time, the ramp from Shady Grove Road to westbound I-370 was shifted to a new alignment. In 2009, the lanes along I-370 were shifted to allow for construction of the MD 200 interchange. Construction on this segment of MD 200 was completed in February 2011, with the road opening to traffic on February 23. As a result of the completion of MD 200, the eastern terminus of I-370 was truncated to the west end of MD 200, with the freeway connection to the Shady Grove station becoming MD 200A.

== Exit list ==
The entire route is in Montgomery County.

Location	mi	km	Exit	Destinations	Notes
Gaithersburg	0.00	0.00	—	Sam Eig Highway	Continuation west
Gaithersburg	0.43	0.69	1	I-270 – Frederick, Washington	Signed as exits 1A (south) and 1B (north); exit number not signed eastbound; exits 9A-B on I-270
Gaithersburg	1.15	1.85	—	Shady Grove Road to MD 355 south – Rockville	Eastbound exit only
Gaithersburg	1.93	3.11	2	MD 355 (Frederick Road) – Gaithersburg, Rockville, Town Center	No eastbound access to MD 355 south; former US 240
Derwood	2.54	4.09	3	Shady Grove Road – Metro Station	Access via MD 200A; signed as exits 3A (Shady Grove) and 3B (Metro) eastbound; last eastbound exit before toll
Derwood	2.54	4.09	—	MD 200 east to I-95	Continuation east
1.000 mi = 1.609 km; 1.000 km = 0.621 mi: Electronic toll collection
