= Redland, Maryland =

- Census-designated place
- Location of Redland, Maryland
- Coordinates: 39°07′45″N 77°08′10″W
- Country: United States
- State: Maryland
- County: Montgomery

Area
  - Total: 7.34 sq mi (19.02 km^{2})
  - Land: 7.19 sq mi (18.63 km^{2})
  - Water: 0.15 sq mi (0.39 km^{2})
- Elevation: 407 ft (124 m)

Population (2020)
  - Total: 18,592
  - Density: 2,584.5/sq mi (997.88/km^{2})
- Time zone: UTC−5 (Eastern (EST))
  - Summer (DST): UTC−4 (EDT)
- FIPS code: 24-65312
- GNIS feature ID: 2389735

Redland is a census-designated place and an unincorporated area in Montgomery County, Maryland, United States. It had a population of 18,592 as of the 2020 census.

== History ==
The area that is now Redland was part of a 100-acre tract called "Banks' Venture," which was surveyed for John Banks on November 29, 1752. in 1862, the area of Redland shows up on at least one map as an intersection. It is around this time that the settlement of Redland begins taking shape.

During the American Civil War, Redland experienced political tensions. With a prominent farmer, landholder, community leader, and politician; Hazel B. Cashell being arrested for treason. By 1879, Redland was well settled with a population of about 50. The community now had a church, Emory Grove Methodist Episcopal Church, located one mile north of town, a public school, several different merchants, blacksmiths, and physicians. The soil was productive and easily improvable; due to this the local economy was centered around farming.

By 1941, Redland was still classified as a village and its population had grown to 91 residents.

== Geography ==
As an unincorporated area, Redland's boundaries are not officially defined. Redland is, however, recognized by the United States Census Bureau and by the United States Geological Survey as a census-designated place.

According to the United States Census Bureau, the place has a total area of 7.0 square miles (18 km^{2}), of which 6.9 square miles (18 km^{2}) is land and 0.1 square miles (0.26 km^{2}) (1.86%) is water.

== Climate ==
Redland has usually warm to hot summers and chilly and cool/cold winters with temperatures usually below freezing in the winter and above 70 °F in the summer.

== Demographics ==
Historical population
Year	Pop.	±%
1879	50	—
1941	91	+82.0%
2000	16,998	+18579.1%
2010	17,242	+1.4%
2020	18,592	+7.8%

=== 2020 census ===
As of the 2020 census, Redland had a population of 18,592. The median age was 38.5 years. 23.2% of residents were under the age of 18 and 14.4% of residents were 65 years of age or older. For every 100 females there were 98.2 males, and for every 100 females age 18 and over there were 95.1 males age 18 and over.

100.0% of residents lived in urban areas, while 0.0% lived in rural areas.

There were 6,087 households in Redland, of which 36.8% had children under the age of 18 living in them. Of all households, 59.2% were married-couple households, 13.8% were households with a male householder and no spouse or partner present, and 22.0% were households with a female householder and no spouse or partner present. About 17.1% of all households were made up of individuals and 5.8% had someone living alone who was 65 years of age or older.

There were 6,265 housing units, of which 2.8% were vacant. The homeowner vacancy rate was 0.8% and the rental vacancy rate was 4.2%.

Racial composition as of the 2020 census
Race	Number	Percent
White	6,858	36.9%
Black or African American	2,868	15.4%
American Indian and Alaska Native	144	0.8%
Asian	3,228	17.4%
Native Hawaiian and Other Pacific Islander	9	0.0%
Some other race	3,015	16.2%
Two or more races	2,470	13.3%
Hispanic or Latino (of any race)	5,256	28.3%

=== 2000 census ===
As of the 2000 census, there were 16,998 people, 5,272 households, and 4,423 families living in the area. The population density was 2,474.3 inhabitants per square mile (955.3/km^{2}). There were 5,425 housing units at an average density of 789.7 per square mile (304.9/km^{2}). The racial makeup of the area was 55.04% White, 15.75% African American, 0.35% Native American, 15.94% Asian, 0.05% Pacific Islander, 8.6% from other races, and 4.29% from two or more races. Hispanic or Latino of any race were 15.1% of the population.

There were 5,272 households, out of which 44.8% had children under the age of 18 living with them, 68.3% were married couples living together, 11.6% had a female householder with no husband present, and 16.1% were non-families. 11.3% of all households were made up of individuals, and 2.6% had someone living alone who was 65 years of age or older. The average household size was 3.22 and the average family size was 3.46.

In the area, the population was spread out, with 29.7% under the age of 18, 7.8% from 18 to 24, 30.2% from 25 to 44, 25.8% from 45 to 64, and 6.6% who were 65 years of age or older. The median age was 35 years. For every 100 females, there were 98.5 males. For every 100 females age 18 and over, there were 95.2 males.

The median income for a household in the area was $80,821, and the median income for a family was $82,146. Males had a median income of $52,776 versus $37,482 for females. The per capita income for the area was $27,542. About 4.0% of families and 5.4% of the population were below the poverty line, including 6.5% of those under age 18 and 10.4% of those age 65 or over.
