= Maryland Route 109 =

State highway in Montgomery County, Maryland, US

Maryland Route 109
- Maryland Route 109 highlighted in red

Route information
- Maintained by MDSHA
- Length: 11.87 mi (19.10 km)
- Existed: 1927–present
- Tourist routes: Chesapeake and Ohio Canal Scenic Byway; Antietam Campaign Scenic Byway

Major junctions
- South end: MD 107 in Poolesville
- MD 28 in Beallsville; I-270 near Hyattstown
- North end: MD 355 in Hyattstown

Location
- Country: United States
- State: Maryland
- Counties: Montgomery

Highway system
- Maryland highway system; Interstate; US; State; Scenic Byways
← MD 108	→ MD 112

Maryland Route 109 (MD 109) is a state highway in the U.S. state of Maryland. The highway runs 11.87 miles (19.10 km) from MD 107 in Poolesville north to MD 355 in Hyattstown. MD 109 connects the northwestern Montgomery County communities of Poolesville, Beallsville, Barnesville, and Hyattstown with each other and with Interstate 270 (I-270). The highway was built between Beallsville and Barnesville by 1910. MD 109 was extended to Poolesville in the early 1920s and to Comus in the late 1920s. The route was extended north through its early 1950s interchange with I-270 to Hyattstown in the late 1950s.

== Route description ==
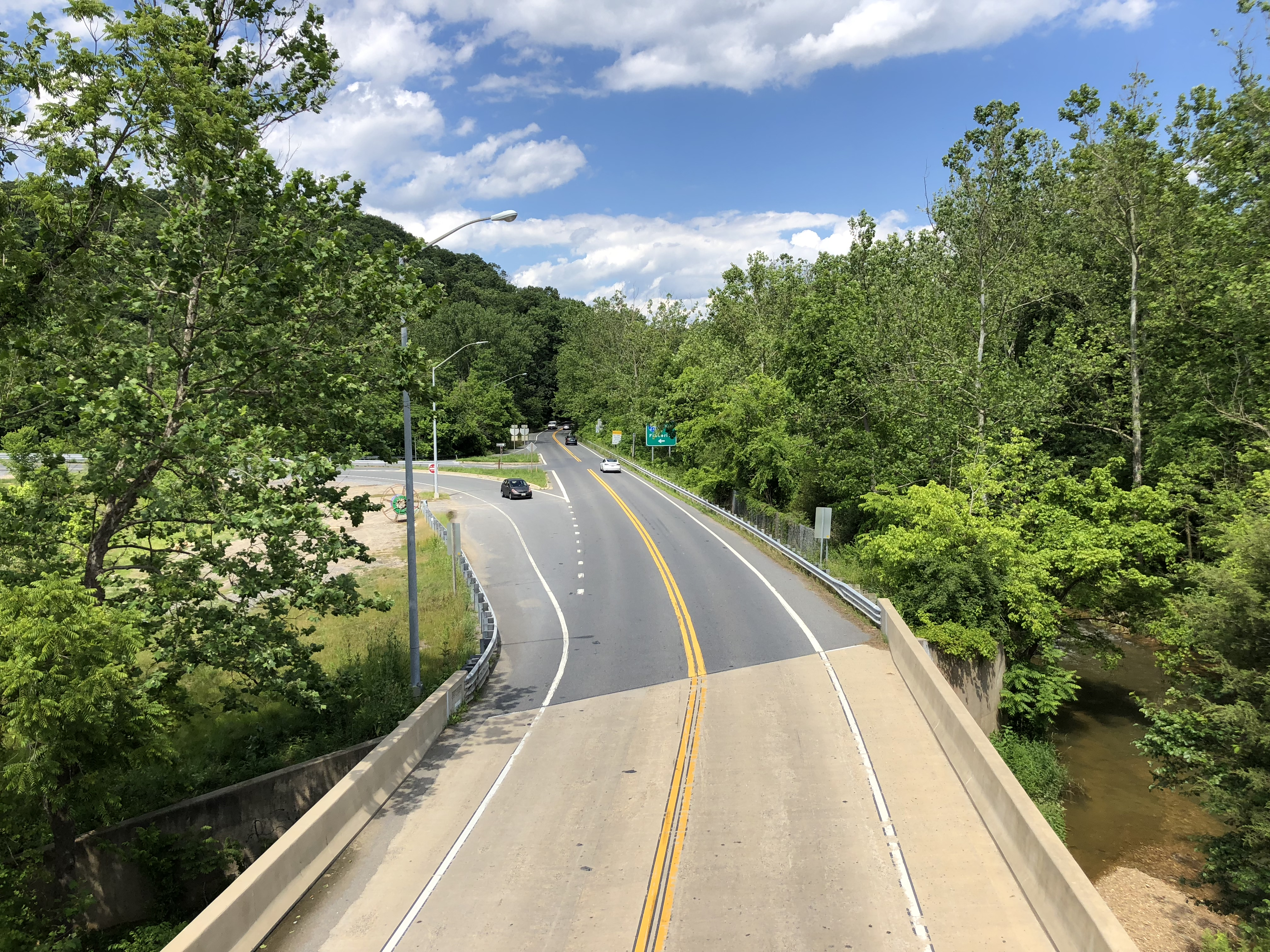
View north along MD 109 from I-270 in Hyattstown.

MD 109 begins at the intersection of Elgin Road and Fisher Avenue in the town of Poolesville. The intersection also serves as the western terminus of MD 107, which heads east along Fisher Avenue through the Poolesville Historic District. MD 109 heads north along two-lane undivided Elgin Road, which becomes Beallsville Road when it leaves the town. The highway passes by the historic homes Chiswell's Inheritance and Dowden's Luck before passing through the village of Beallsville, where the route intersects MD 28 (Darnestown Road). MD 109 continues northeast and passes under CSX's Metropolitan Subdivision railroad line south of Barnesville; next to the railroad bridge is the Barnesville station serving MARC's Brunswick Line. The highway continues through the town of Barnesville, where the route turns east onto Barnesville Road then north onto Old Hundred Road. MD 109 crosses a branch of the Little Monocacy River and intersects Comus Road in the hamlet of Comus; Comus Road leads west to Sugarloaf Mountain. The highway veers east at the Montgomery–Frederick county line, which the route briefly follows, and meets I-270 (Eisenhower Memorial Highway) at a partial cloverleaf interchange. MD 109 closely parallels Little Bennett Creek and crosses it within the interchange. The highway reaches its eastern terminus at MD 355 (Frederick Road) in the village of Hyattstown, a short distance south of MD 355's intersection with MD 75 (Green Valley Road) on the opposite side of the county line.

== History ==
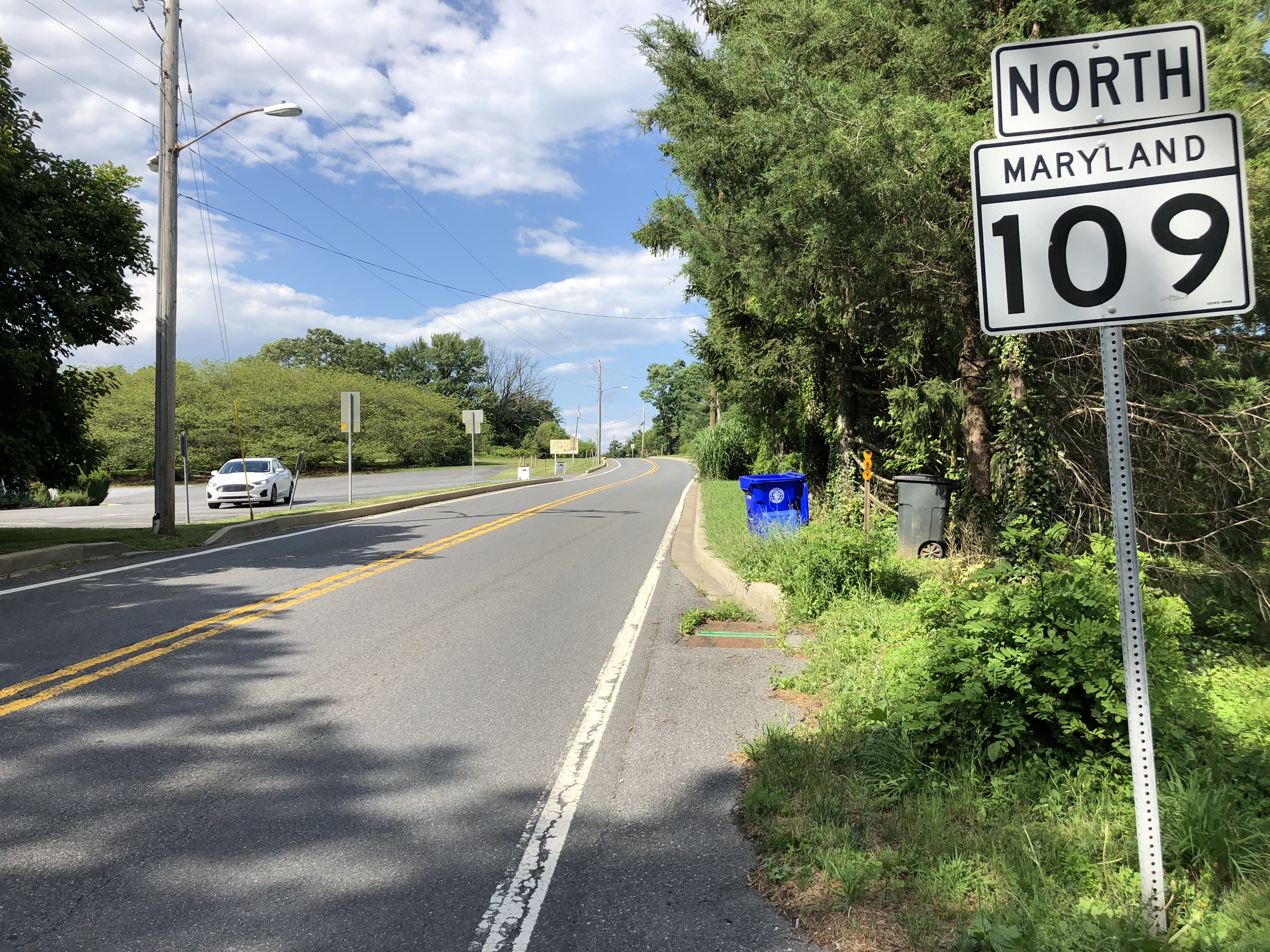
View north along MD 109 at Comus Road in Comus.

The first segment of the highway that became MD 109 was constructed as a macadam road by Montgomery County with state aid by 1910. The modern road was built from the southern edge of Beallsville to the center of Barnesville. As of 1910, the improved road was proposed to be extended to Poolesville; however, the Beallsville–Poolesville segment of the macadam road was not completed until 1923. The highway was extended north from Barnesville to Comus in two sections. The first segment was built in 1925 and 1926; the road was completed to Comus in 1927 and 1928. A disjoint segment of MD 109 was built as a concrete road along Westerly Road between Edwards Ferry Road and Willard Road on the southern edge of Poolesville in 1929 and 1930. The county highway between MD 95 at Comus and U.S. Route 240 (now MD 355) at Hyattstown was reconstructed as a macadam road by the Maryland State Roads Commission between 1936 and 1938. MD 109's bridge across Little Bennett Creek and its interchange with Washington National Pike (now I-270) were constructed between 1951 and 1953. The disjoint segment of MD 109 south of Poolesville was transferred to county maintenance in 1957. MD 109 was extended from Comus to Hyattstown in 1960.

== Junction list ==
The entire route is in Montgomery County.

Location	mi	km	Destinations	Notes
Poolesville	0.00	0.00	MD 107 east (Fisher Avenue) / Elgin Road south / Fisher Avenue west – Dawsonville, White's Ferry	Southern terminus; western terminus of MD 107
Beallsville	2.41	3.88	MD 28 (Darnestown Road) – Frederick, Rockville	
Hyattstown	11.35	18.27	I-270 (Eisenhower Memorial Highway) – Frederick, Washington	I-270 Exit 22
Hyattstown	11.87	19.10	MD 355 (Frederick Road) to MD 75 – Clarksburg, Urbana	Northern terminus
1.000 mi = 1.609 km; 1.000 km = 0.621 mi
