= Maryland Route 107 =

State highway in Montgomery County, Maryland, US

Maryland Route 107
- Maryland Route 107 highlighted in red

Route information
- Maintained by MDSHA
- Length: 4.79 mi (7.71 km)
- Existed: 1927–present

Major junctions
- West end: MD 109 in Poolesville
- East end: MD 28 at Dawsonville

Location
- Country: United States
- State: Maryland
- Counties: Montgomery

Highway system
- Maryland highway system; Interstate; US; State; Scenic Byways
← MD 104	→ MD 108

Maryland Route 107 (MD 107) is a state highway in the U.S. state of Maryland. Known for most of its length as Whites Ferry Road, the highway runs 4.79 miles (7.71 km) from MD 109 in Poolesville east to MD 28 in Dawsonville. MD 107 connects the western Montgomery County town of Poolesville with Rockville and Gaithersburg via MD 28. The highway and county-maintained Whites Ferry Road west of Poolesville connect those cities with White's Ferry, a Potomac River ferry north of Leesburg, Virginia. MD 107 was constructed from Dawsonville to Poolesville in the late 1910s. The highway was extended west part of the way to White's Ferry in the late 1920s and early 1930s. The western terminus of MD 107 was truncated at Poolesville in the mid-1970s.

== Route description ==
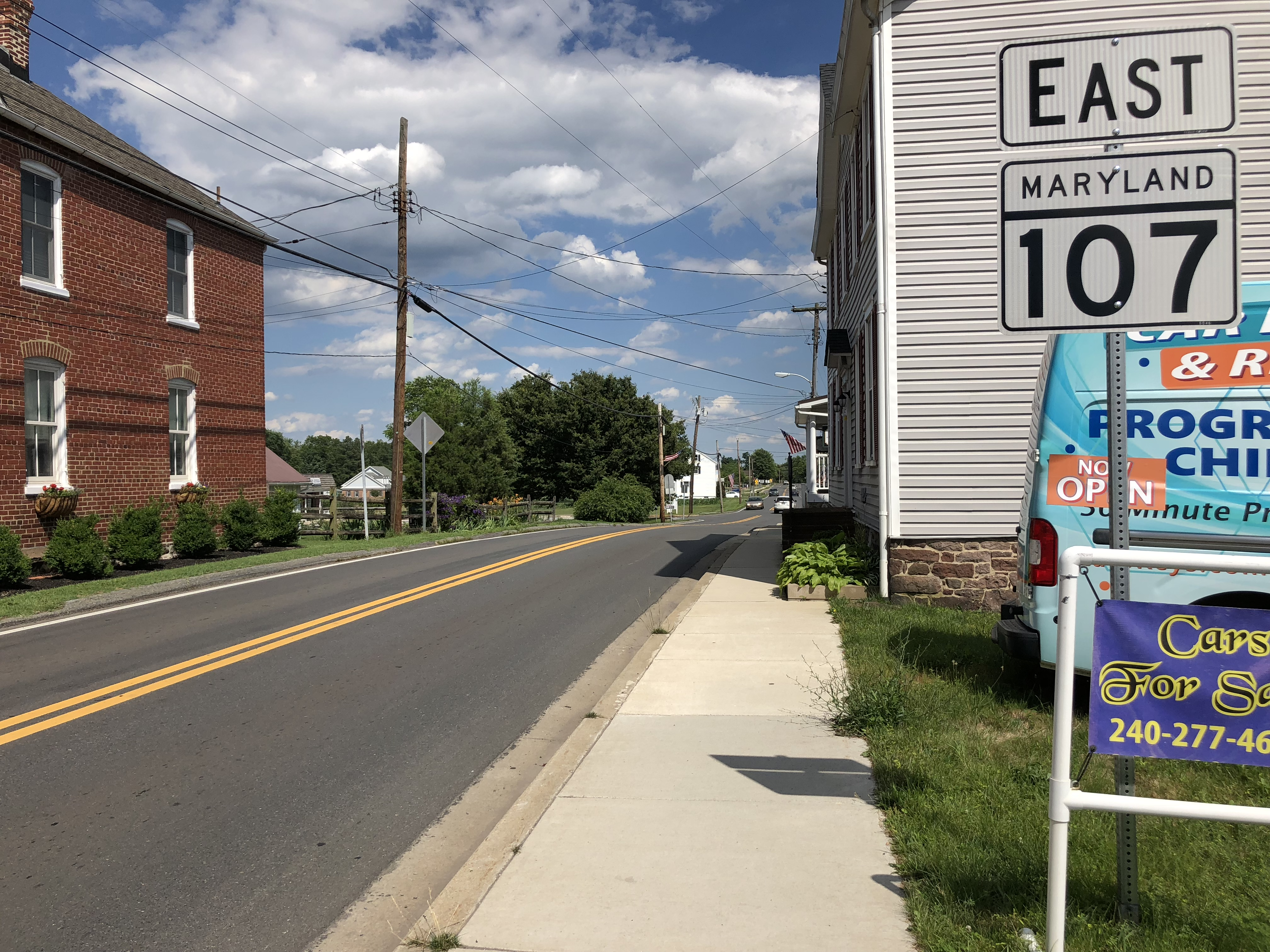
View east along MD 107 at MD 109 in Poolesville

MD 107's western terminus is at the intersection of Fisher Avenue and Elgin Road, which heads north as MD 109, in the town of Poolesville. Fisher Avenue continues west and leaves the town as Whites Ferry Road, which leads to White's Ferry across the Potomac River. White's Ferry Road continues across the river in Loudoun County, Virginia, as Virginia State Route 655, which leads to U.S. Route 15 (James Monroe Highway) north of Leesburg. MD 107 heads east as a two- to three-lane undivided street through the Poolesville Historic District. The highway's name changes to Whites Ferry Road at Budd Road and the route passes the historic home Valhalla as it leaves the town as a two-lane undivided road. MD 107 passes the historic farm complex Darnall Place near its crossing of Dry Seneca Creek. The highway intersects Sugarland Road in the village of Dawsonville before the route reaches its eastern terminus at an oblique intersection with MD 28 (Darnestown Road).

== History ==
MD 107 was constructed as a 12-foot-wide (3.7 m) old-bound macadam road by Montgomery County with state aid from Dawsonville to Poolesville between 1916 and 1918 with the purpose of connecting Poolesville and Washington, D.C., with a modern highway. The highway was extended as a concrete road from Poolesville west to Edwards Ferry Road in 1928 and 1929. MD 107 was extended west as a concrete road to near Martinsburg Road in the hamlet of Martinsburg in 1931 and 1932. The highway was resurfaced and widened from Poolesville to Dawsonville by 1946. The western terminus of MD 107 was truncated at MD 109 in Poolesville in 1974.

== Junction list ==
The entire route is in Montgomery County.

Location	mi	km	Destinations	Notes
Poolesville	0.00	0.00	MD 109 north (Elgin Road) / Fisher Avenue west / Elgin Road south – White's Ferry, Beallsville	Western terminus; southern terminus of MD 109
Dawsonville	4.79	7.71	MD 28 (Darnestown Road) – Beallsville, Darnestown	Eastern terminus
1.000 mi = 1.609 km; 1.000 km = 0.621 mi
