= Yoo on the Park =

Apartment building in Atlanta, Georgia, US

The Registry on the Park
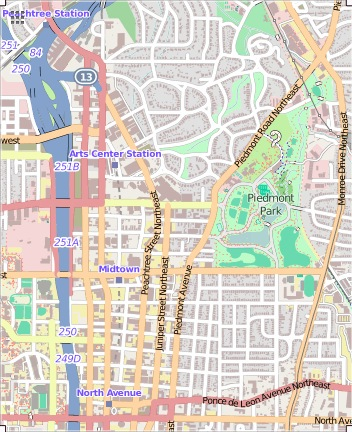
- Location within Atlanta Midtown Yoo on the Park (Atlanta) Yoo on the Park (Georgia) Yoo on the Park (the United States)

General information
- Status: Completed
- Type: High-rise apartment building
- Location: 207 13th Street; Atlanta, Georgia, United States
- Coordinates: 33°47′6.3″N 84°22′49″W
- Construction started: February 2015
- Completed: 2017
- Opened: March 2017

Height
- Height: 321.46 feet (97.98 m)

Design and construction
- Architect: Yoo Worldwide

The Registry on the Park, formerly known as Yoo on the Park, is a 25-story apartment building in Atlanta, Georgia, United States. Completed in 2017, the building is located in Midtown Atlanta, near Piedmont Park.

== History ==
The project was mentioned in a 2015 interview by Multi-Housing News with the CEO of The Trillist Companies, wherein he claimed that the project was part of a partnership between his company and YOO Studio. As part of the interview, he claimed that the project would see the construction of a 25-story apartment building adjacent to Piedmont Park. According to the official website for Midtown Atlanta, the building is "Atlanta's first internationally designed and branded luxury residential apartment community." As part of the construction, the developers purchased 120,000 square feet (11,000 m^{2}) of development rights (a process known as transferable development rights) from the Margaret Mitchell House and Museum. In 2016, it was announced that the bottom floor retail space would house a cryotherapy facility. The apartment officially opened in March 2017. In September, a one-year lease to an apartment in the building was auctioned off as part of a fundraising event for the Piedmont Park Conservancy.
