= Montgomery County Agricultural Reserve =

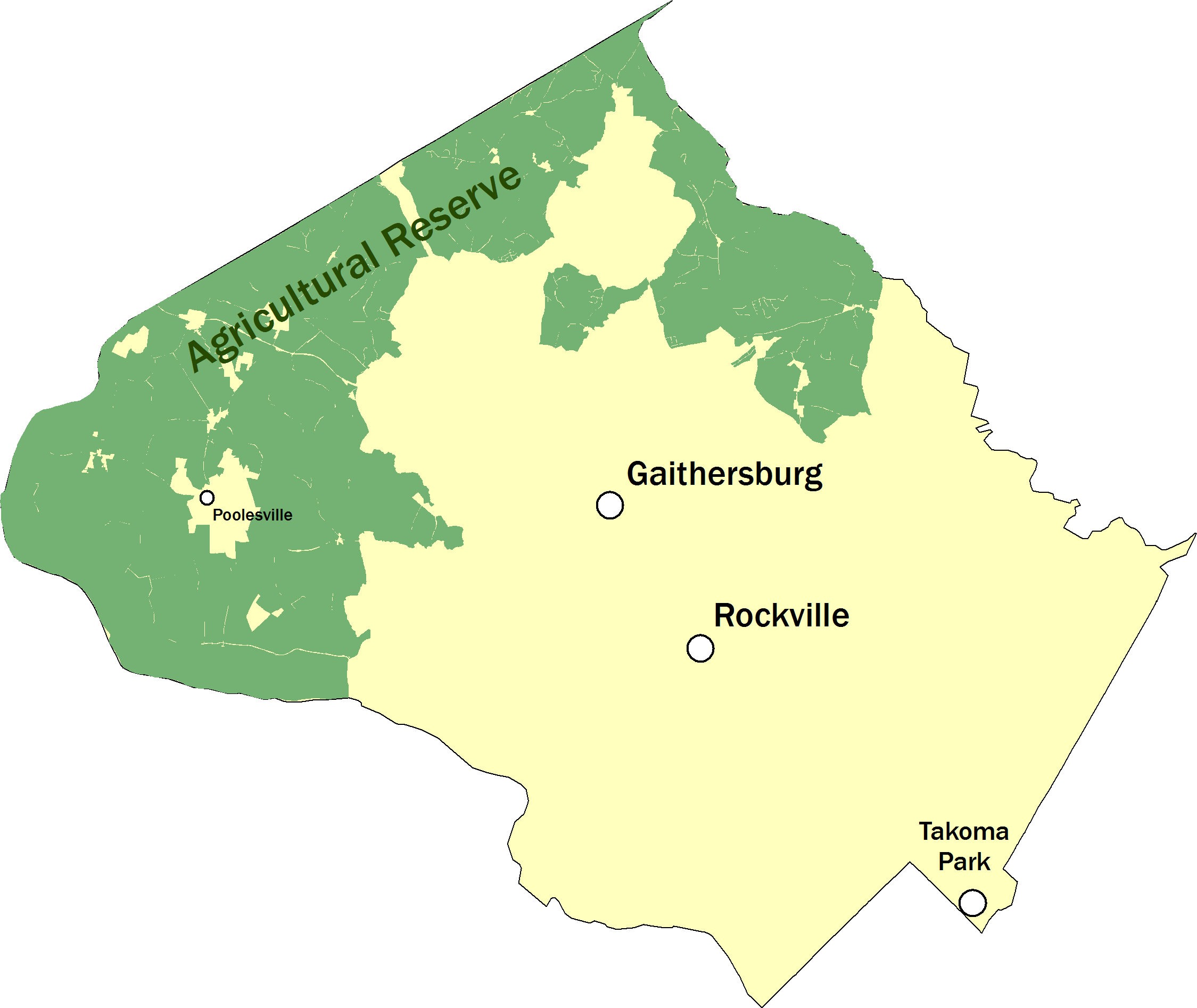
Map showing the Reserve within Montgomery County

The Agricultural Reserve is a designated land use zone in Montgomery County, Maryland. The 93,000 acres (380 km^{2}) zone was created in 1980 by the Montgomery County Council to preserve farm land and rural space in the northwestern part of the county. The farmland protection program has been characterized as "the most famous, most studied and most emulated" program of its kind in the United States.

== Background ==
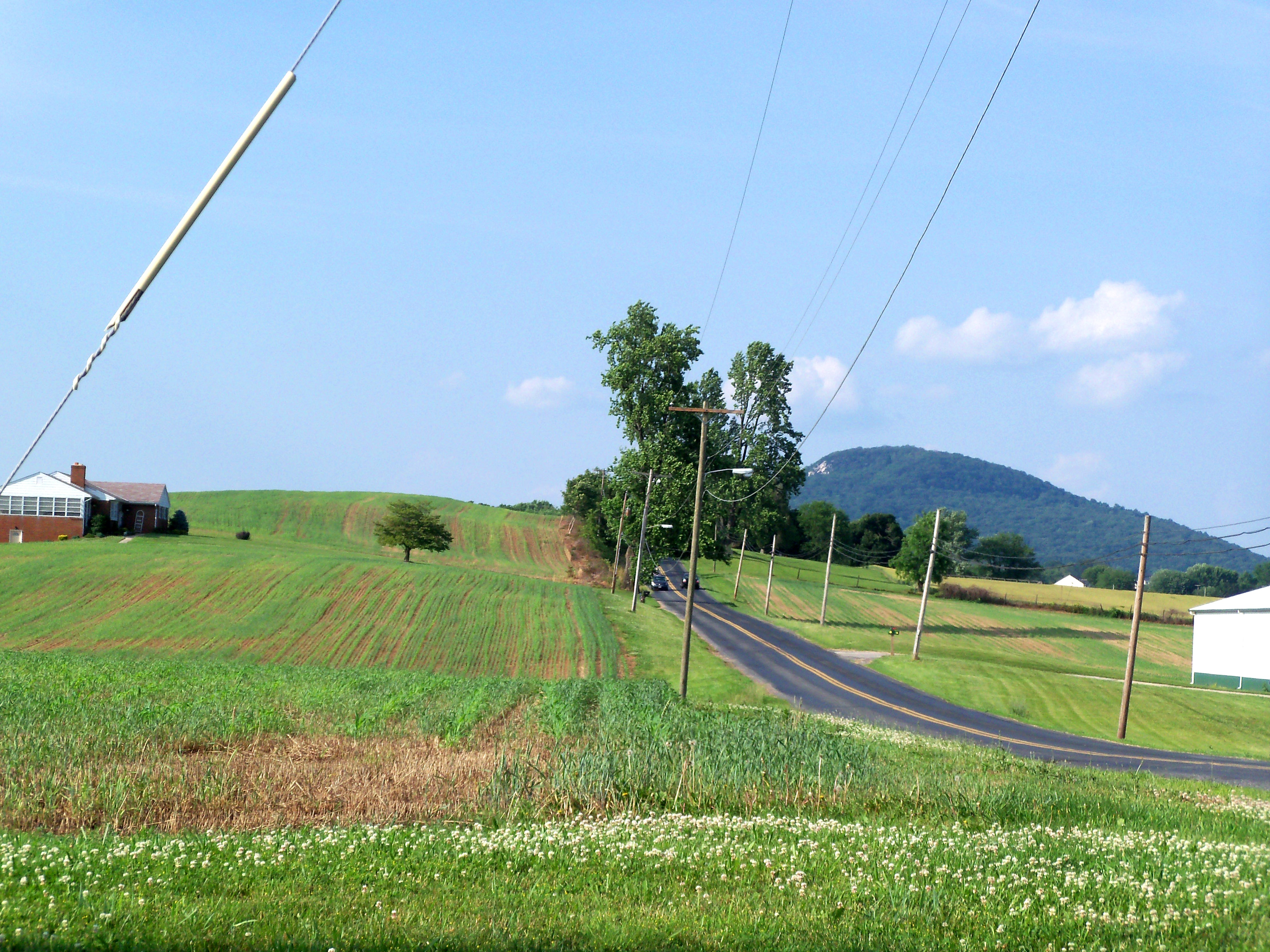
Preserved agricultural land in the Reserve near Sugarloaf Mountain

County residents and government planners began to notice the loss of agricultural land and open space as early as the 1950s, associated with the increase in suburbanization following World War II. The general demand for housing in the region was making the farm land increasingly attractive to developers, and the increased property values encouraged many farmers to sell. About one half of the county's farm land was converted to non-farm ownership by the 1960s. The Maryland-National Capital Park and Planning Commission noted a loss of 18,768 acres (75.95 km^{2}) acres of farm land over an 8-year period in the 1970s, an average of 2,346 acres/year.

Following studies by a County task force and public discussion, the Council established the Agricultural and Rural Open Space Master Plan in 1980. The overall goals of the agricultural zone are to preserve farms, productive soils, and a way of life. It seeks to preserve farmland through:

- Control of public costs and prevention of urban sprawl
- Adherence to County growth management systems
- Preservation of regional food supplies
- Energy conservation
- Protection of the environment
- Maintenance of open space
- Preservation of rural life styles.

The county government identified two contiguous areas in its northern region that would define the outer boundaries of the agricultural zone. The first area, near the towns of Poolesville and Barnesville, was 110,000 acres (450 km^{2}) and contained most of the contiguous farmland. The second area, east of Olney, was 26,000 acres (110 km^{2}), and had some farmland but was fragmented with residential subdivisions. However, the county decided that some of the remaining farmland and open space in this area could be preserved if future residential development was clustered.

== Rural density transfer zone and Transferable Development Rights ==
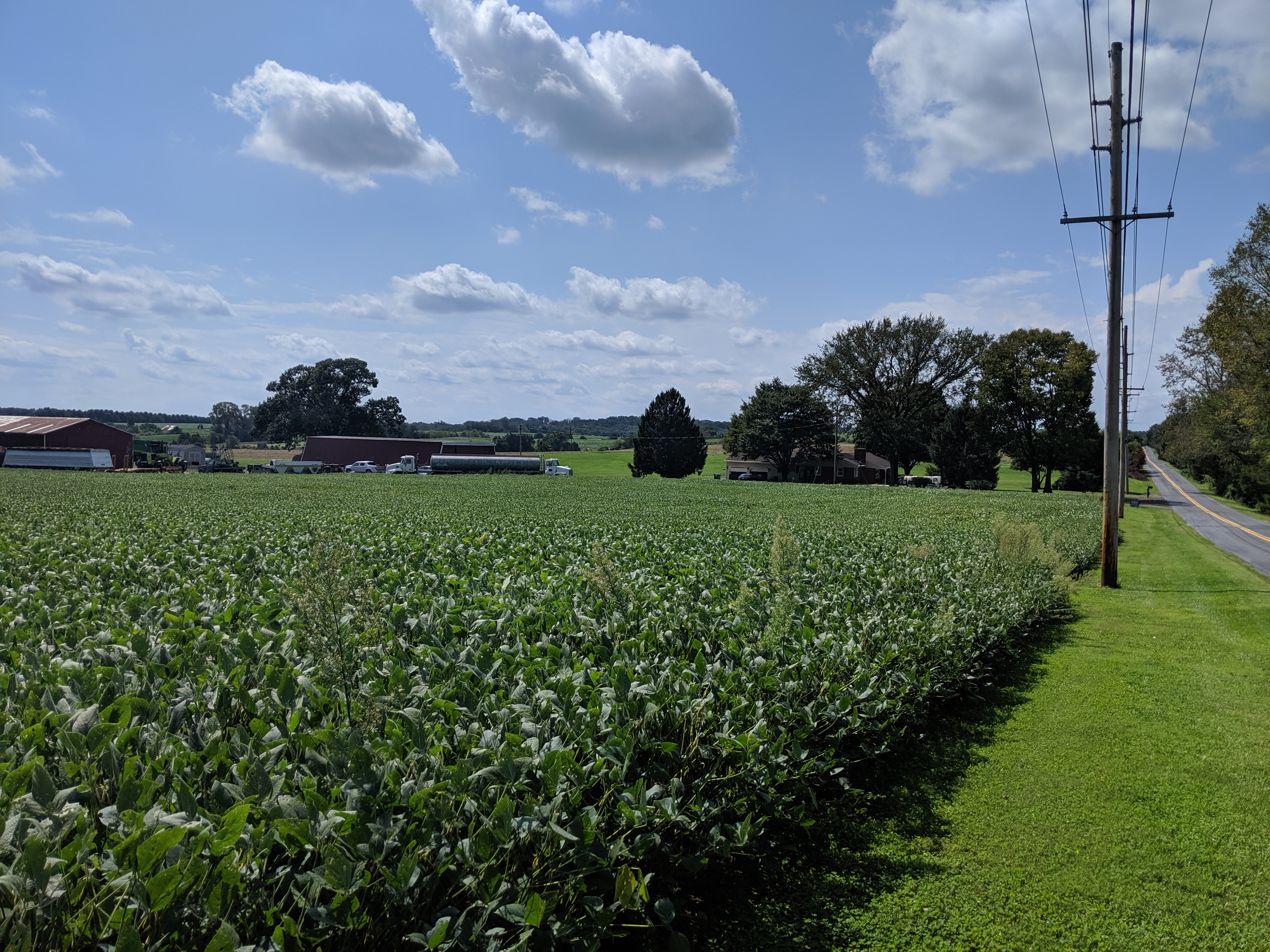
A farm in Beallsville

The 1980 legislation authorized the County government to define a Rural Density Transfer Zone within the Agricultural Reserve, wherein development of new housing is limited to one house per 25 acres (100,000 m^{2}). Previously the allowed density was one house per 5 acres (20,000 m^{2}). The County Council compensated the rural property owners for their loss of developability, through the creation of a legal property right called a Transferable Development Right (TDR). The council assigned one TDR for every five acres of rural land in the designated area. A TDR could be sold to someone who wanted to build elsewhere in the county, at a greater density than would otherwise be allowed in that non-rural zone.

Montgomery County planners estimated that between 1981 and 2007 there were transactions that severed 9,700 TDRs from agricultural zone properties. About two-thirds of those rights were transferred to receiving area development projects elsewhere in the county. The county established a task force in 2001 to analyze and facilitate transactions between "supply" properties and receiving areas. The TDR program has preserved 47,903 acres (193.86 km^{2}) acres of agricultural land as of 2022.

== Related programs ==
=== Agricultural Easement Program ===
The county established its Agricultural Easement Program in 1987, whereby the county may purchase easements on agricultural land. The typical properties purchased are a minimum of 50 acres (0.20 km^{2}), but easements for smaller parcels may be purchased if they are located adjacent to cropland.

=== Building Lot Termination Program ===
In 2008 the county established a Building Lot Termination Program (BLT) as an additional measure to address fragmentation of farmland. The program authorizes creation of easements on lots where the TDR program may not be applicable, to restrict non-agricultural land uses in the reserve zone. Similar in concept to a TDR, the easement creates a marketable credit for a landowner, and removes the right to build a dwelling unit on a lot. The landowner may sell the credit to a developer for use in another designated zone within the county. The BLT program has preserved 2,286 acres (9.25 km^{2}) acres of agricultural land as of 2022.

== Benefits ==
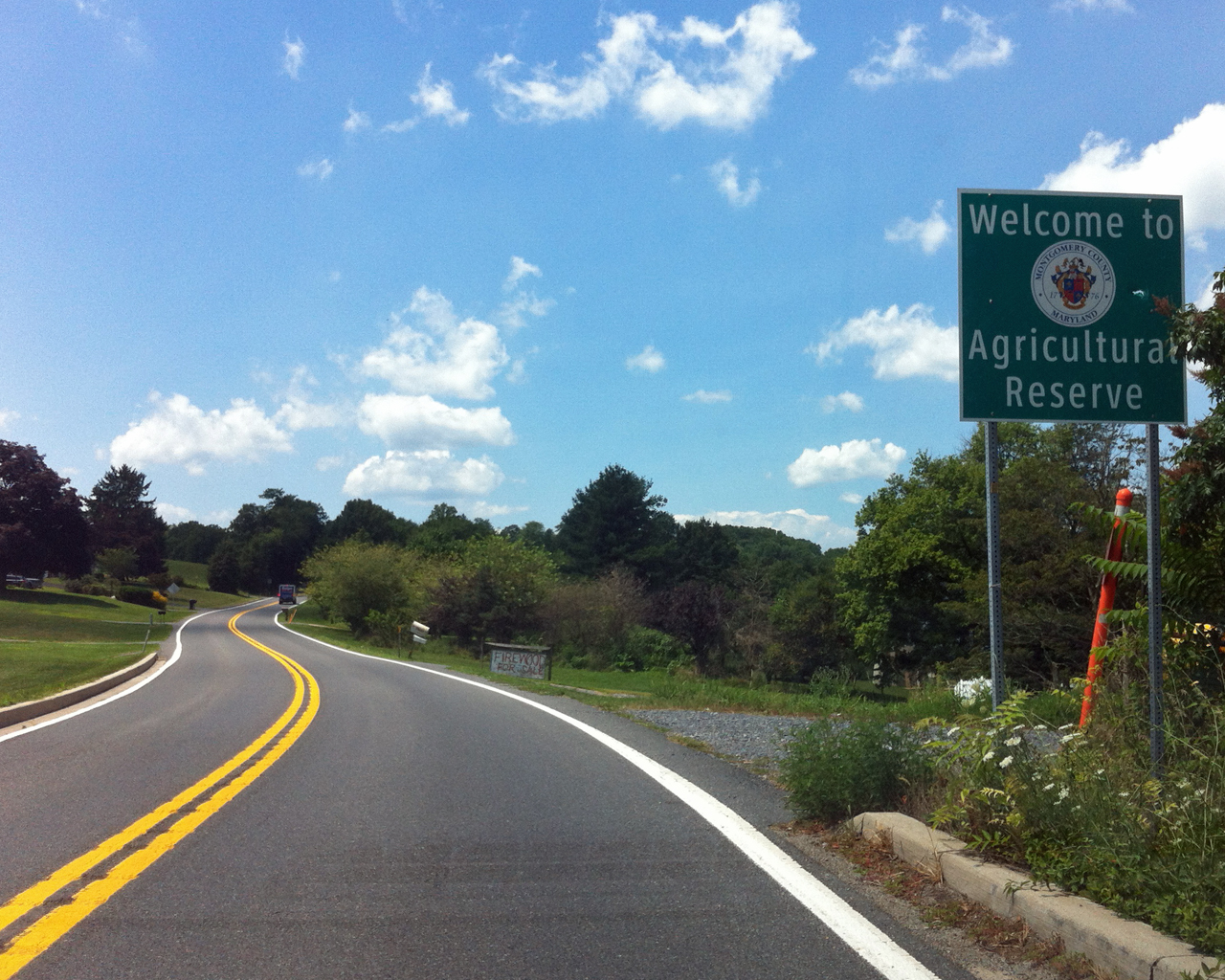
The County Agricultural Reserve is home to farms, wineries and natural spaces

The reserve has received national recognition for its success."Creation of an Agricultural Reserve through a combination of zoning, limitation of sewer service, and use of transferable development rights is one of the nation's most successful and widely emulated efforts to preserve farmland in perpetuity."

According to an advocacy group, the reserve provides the following benefits:

- There are more than 90,000 acres (360 km^{2}) of farmland to enjoy in upper Montgomery County
- Provides pick-your-own produce
- Serves as a "green lung" for the greater Washington, D.C. area, cooling and cleaning the air
- Employs over 10,000 people
- Contributes $250 million to the economy
- Offers recreational activities
  - riding
  - cycling
  - hiking
  - longboarding
  - canoeing
  - fishing
  - hunting
- Habitats for animals
- Historical sites:
  - Civil War sites
  - Underground Railroad
  - 18th and 19th century homes, barns, mills, and schools.

== Potential challenges ==
Among the challenges to maintaining the character of the Agricultural Reserve, are several listed by a local advocacy group: The high costs of operating a farm in Montgomery County; increased development of private facilities (e.g. private schools); and development of new highways.
