= Barnesville, Maryland =

- Town
- Seal

- Location of Barnesville, Maryland
- Coordinates: 39°13′17″N 77°22′40″W
- Country: United States
- State: Maryland
- County: Montgomery
- Incorporated: 1888

Area
  - Total: 0.49 sq mi (1.27 km^{2})
  - Land: 0.49 sq mi (1.27 km^{2})
  - Water: 0 sq mi (0.00 km^{2})
- Elevation: 538 ft (164 m)

Population (2020)
  - Total: 144
  - Density: 294.5/sq mi (113.71/km^{2})
- Time zone: UTC-5 (Eastern (EST))
  - Summer (DST): UTC-4 (EDT)
- ZIP code: 20838
- Area codes: 301, 240
- FIPS code: 24-04475
- GNIS feature ID: 2390713
- Website: www.barnesvillemd.org

Barnesville is a town in Montgomery County, Maryland, United States. It was incorporated in 1888. The population was 144 at the 2020 census.

== History ==
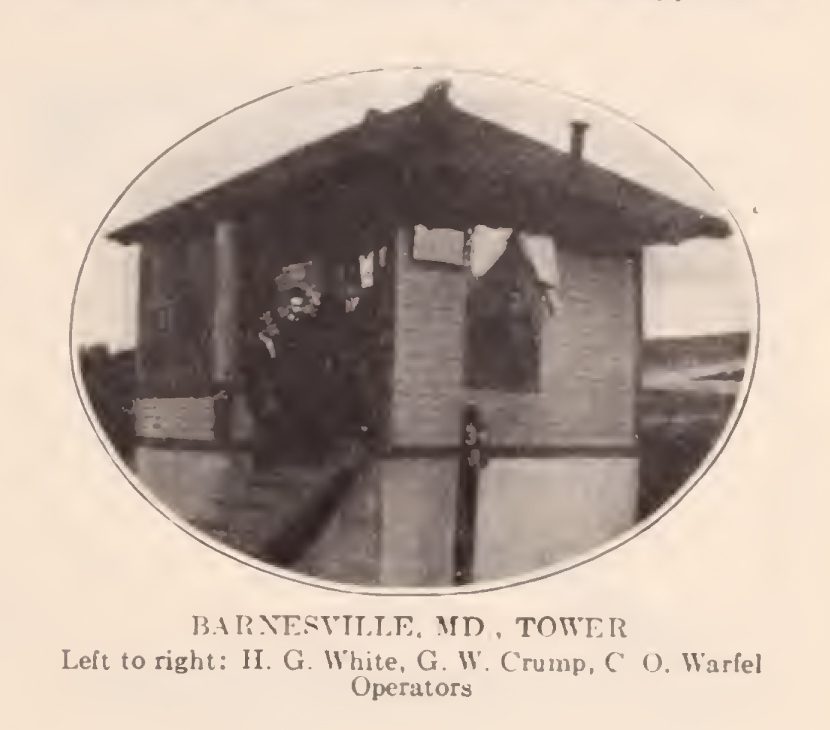
Railroad Tower, Barnesville, Maryland, circa 1914

The Maryland General Assembly chartered the town of Barnesville in 1811 and named it in honor of its earliest settler, Williams Barnes. In its early years, the village developed as a regional center for industry and commerce, with two taverns, a blacksmith shop, and a resident physician, a Dr. Lisle. In the 1830s, Barnesville Academy operated on the Hays Farm under the leadership of Irish immigrant Thomas Carr Lannan. Jesuit Ministers from Frederick first held mass in Barnesville and led in the creation of St. Mary's Church in 1807. The church yard contains several graves from immigrant workers who died of cholera while building the Chesapeake & Ohio Canal. Barnesville Baptist Church was organized in 1871 and still worships in its original frame building on the east side of the town.

== Geography ==
According to the United States Census Bureau, the town has a total area of 0.49 square miles (1.27 km^{2}), all land.

=== Climate ===
The climate in this area is characterized by hot, humid summers and generally mild to cool winters. According to the Köppen Climate Classification system, Barnesville has a humid subtropical climate, abbreviated "Cfa" on climate maps.

== Demographics ==
Historical population
Census	Pop.	Note	%±
1910	154		—
1920	149		−3.2%
1930	110		−26.2%
1940	121		10.0%
1950	130		7.4%
1960	145		11.5%
1970	162		11.7%
1980	141		−13.0%
1990	170		20.6%
2000	161		−5.3%
2010	172		6.8%
2020	144		−16.3%
U.S. Decennial Census

=== 2010 census ===
As of the census of 2010, there were 172 people, 67 households, and 55 families living in the town. The population density was 351.0 inhabitants per square mile (135.5/km^{2}). There were 71 housing units at an average density of 144.9 per square mile (55.9/km^{2}). The racial makeup of the town was 91.3% White, 2.3% African American, 1.7% Native American, 0.6% Asian, and 4.1% from two or more races. Hispanic or Latino of any race were 1.2% of the population.

There were 67 households, of which 40.3% had children under the age of 18 living with them, 67.2% were married couples living together, 4.5% had a female householder with no husband present, 10.4% had a male householder with no wife present, and 17.9% were non-families. 17.9% of all households were made up of individuals, and 9% had someone living alone who was 65 years of age or older. The average household size was 2.57 and the average family size was 2.89.

The median age in the town was 48 years. 25.6% of residents were under the age of 18; 3.4% were between the ages of 18 and 24; 13.4% were from 25 to 44; 40.2% were from 45 to 64; and 17.4% were 65 years of age or older. The gender makeup of the town was 48.8% male and 51.2% female.

=== 2000 census ===
As of the census of 2000, there were 161 people, 59 households, and 49 families living in the town. The population density was 330.7 inhabitants per square mile (127.7/km^{2}). There were 65 housing units at an average density of 133.5 per square mile (51.5/km^{2}). The racial makeup of the town was 96.89% White, 1.86% African American, and 1.24% from two or more races. Hispanic or Latino of any race were 0.62% of the population.

There were 59 households, out of which 37.3% had children under the age of 18 living with them, 71.2% were married couples living together, 6.8% had a female householder with no husband present, and 15.3% were non-families. 11.9% of all households were made up of individuals, and 5.1% had someone living alone who was 65 years of age or older. The average household size was 2.73 and the average family size was 2.98.

In the town, the population was spread out, with 28.0% under the age of 18, 3.7% from 18 to 24, 27.3% from 25 to 44, 26.7% from 45 to 64, and 14.3% who were 65 years of age or older. The median age was 41 years. For every 100 females, there were 94.0 males. For every 100 females age 18 and over, there were 96.6 males.

The median income for a household in the town was $78,791, and the median income for a family was $79,581. Males had a median income of $52,188 versus $50,625 for females. The per capita income for the town was $38,001. None of the population or families were below the poverty line.

== Town government ==
The Town of Barnesville is an incorporated municipality in Montgomery County in the state of Maryland. Management of the town's affairs is the responsibility of three commissioners, elected biannually. The commissioners select from among them a president who is informally known as the mayor of the town.

Elected in May 2021 were Mildred Callear, Maria Castner Miller and Michael S Zuckerman. Mildred Callear was again selected as the president of the commissioners for the 2021-2023 session.

== Past presidents of commission ==
1948-1950 Mary Morningstar
1950 L. B. Moon
1950-1959 Mark P. Jeffers
1959-1963 Harold Cooley
1963-1965 Leslie Tod Luhn
1965-1969 Elizabeth H. Tolbert
1969-1971 Jerome Offutt
1971-1975 George Wood
1975-2001 Elizabeth H. Tolbert
2001-2008 Peter T. Menke
2008-2017 Luke Fedders
2017-present Mildred O. Callear

== Barnesville community ==
At the top of a ridge with views of Sugarloaf Mountain to the north and the Catoctin Mountain and Blue Ridge ranges to the west, Barnesville enjoys a connection with the rhythms of the natural world while being within commuting distance to Washington, D.C. The town's motto "A Caring Community" is a testament to the sense of place enjoyed by the town's residents and their neighbors in the Agricultural Reserve of Western Montgomery County.

Barnesville is served by the MARC commuter rail system. The station building was originally a gas metering station in Rockville; it was moved to Barnesville in 1977.

== Education ==
Barnesville is served by the Montgomery County Public Schools.

Schools that serve Barnesville include:

- Barnesville School of Arts & Sciences, a private school for children who are three years of age through eighth grade
- Monocacy Elementary School
- John Poole Middle School
- Poolesville High School

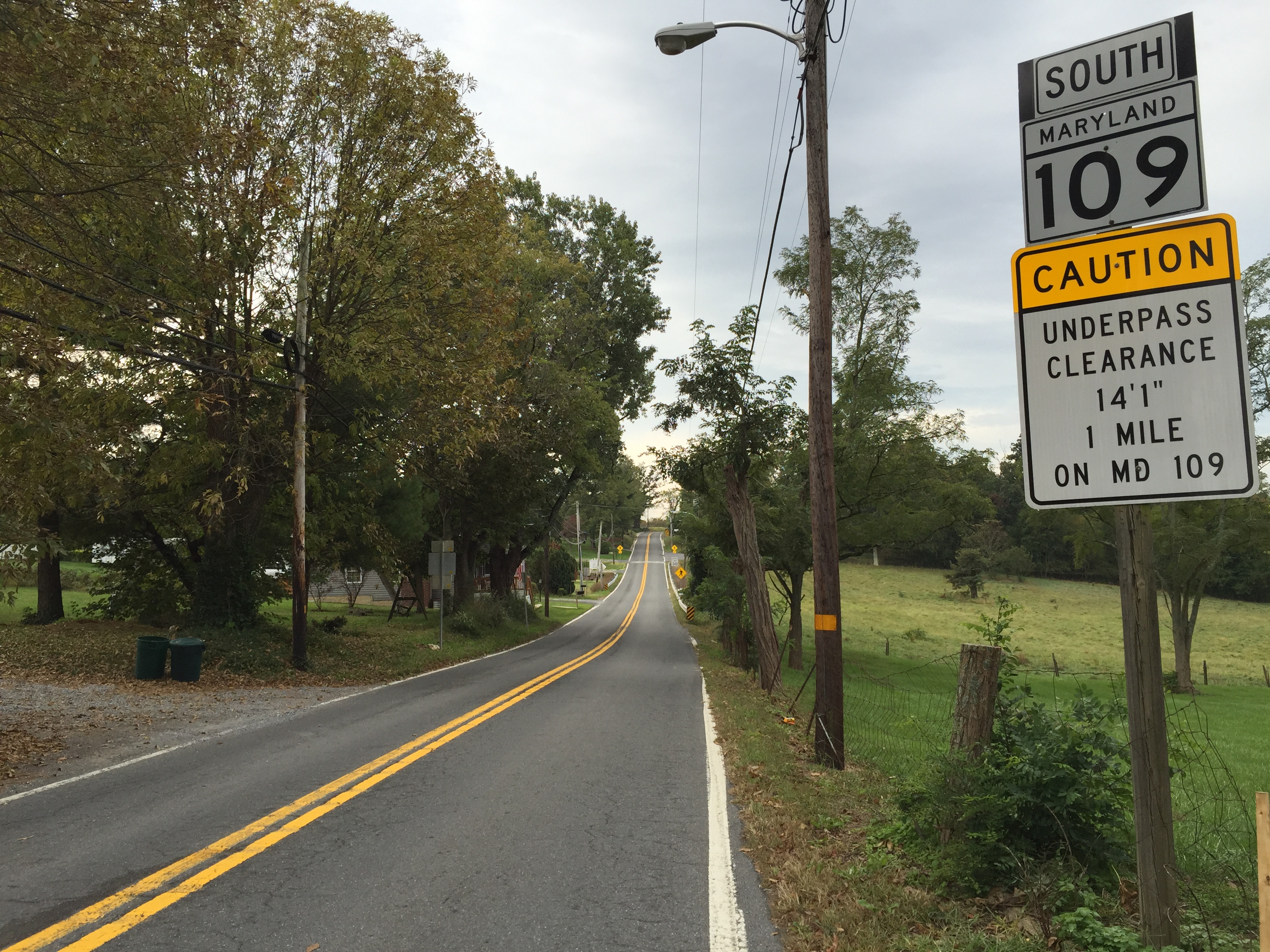
MD 109 southbound leaving Barnesville

== Transportation ==
The only state highway serving Barnesville is Maryland Route 109. MD 109 follows a northeast–southwest alignment but is signed north–south. Northeast of Barnesville, MD 109 interchanges with Interstate 270 and Maryland Route 355 in Hyattstown. To the southwest of Barnesville, MD 109 intersects Maryland Route 28 on its way to Poolesville.

== Notable people ==
- Laurence A. Abercrombie, United States Navy admiral
- Virginia Hall, OSS agent
