= Irvin Smith =

American gridiron football player (born 1967)

Irvin Costello Smith Jr.
Profile
- Positions: Defensive back, Cornerback

Personal information
- Born: March 12, 1967 (age 59); Bethesda, Maryland, U.S.
- Listed height: 6 ft 0 in (1.83 m)
- Listed weight: 185 lb (84 kg)

Career information
- High school: Poolesville
- College: Maryland

Career history
- 1989: New York Jets
- 1991: London Monarchs
- 1991: Hamilton Tiger-Cats*
- 1992: London Monarchs
- 1992: Minnesota Vikings*
- 1992: Saskatchewan Roughriders
- 1993: Washington Redskins*
- 1993: Minnesota Vikings*
- 1994–1995: Baltimore Stallions
- 1996–2001: Montreal Alouettes
- * Offseason or practice squad member only

Awards and highlights
- 83rd Grey Cup champion; 3× CFL All-Star (1994, 1995, 2000); 4× CFL East All-Star (1994, 1996, 1999, 2000)

Irvin Smith (born March 12, 1967) is a former gridiron football defensive back. Smith played college football at Maryland.

Smith attended Poolesville High School in Poolesville, Maryland, where he led the team to the state championship game in 1983 as the starting tailback. He then went on to college at the University of Maryland, where he played defensive back from 1985 to 1988, earning a degree in criminal justice.

Smith attended training camp with the New York Jets of the National Football League (NFL) in 1989 and 1990. In 1991, he played for the London Monarchs of the World League of American Football (WLAF), and was signed by the Hamilton Tiger-Cats of the Canadian Football League (CFL) but released before the season. He played for London again the following season, and made the Saskatchewan Roughriders practice roster, but did not see game action. In 1993, he tried out for the Washington Redskins and the Minnesota Vikings. In 1994, he returned to the CFL with the Baltimore Stallions. He was a two-time all-star and won the Grey Cup in 1995. He continued with the team after it relocated to Canada for six more years with the Montreal Alouettes, being named an all-star in 1996 and 2000.

Today Irvin Smith works as a lieutenant for the Montgomery County Fire and Rescue Service.
