= Dowden's Luck =

Historic house in Maryland, United States

- U.S. National Register of Historic Places
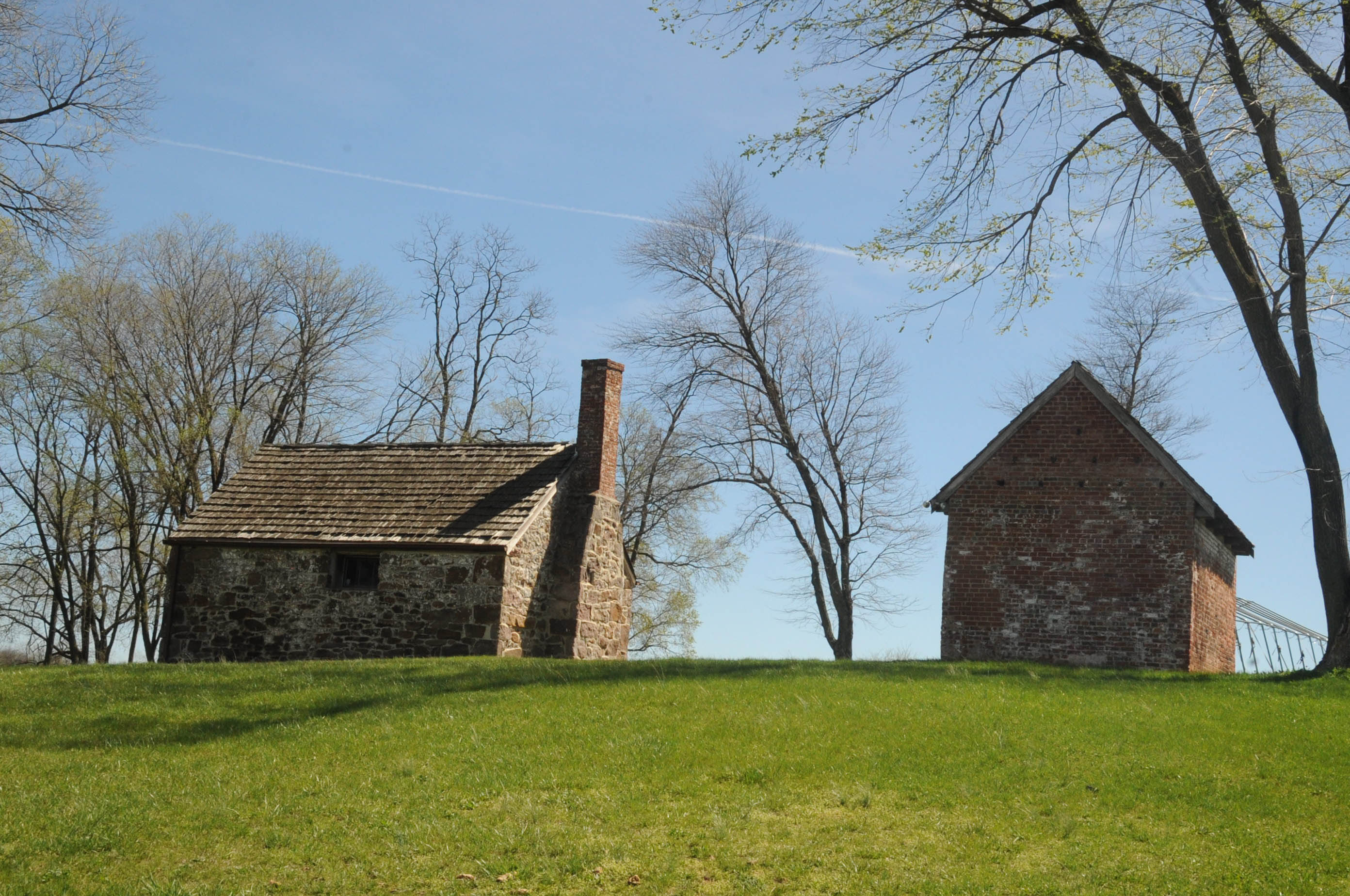
- Smokehouse and slave quarters

- Location within Maryland Location within the United States
- Location: 18511 Beallsville Road (MD 109), Poolesville, Maryland
- Coordinates: 39°9′35″N 77°24′58″W
- Area: 8 acres (3.2 ha)
- Built: 1824
- Architectural style: Federal
- NRHP reference No.: 88002143
- Added to NRHP: November 10, 1988

Dowden's Luck is a historic house located at Poolesville, Montgomery County, Maryland, United States. The main house is a 2 1/2-story, late Federal-style frame house. Major additions were made in 1855 and 1910. Also on the property are a one-story gable-roofed stone slave quarters, a one-story gable-roofed brick smokehouse, a stone spring house, and the foundations of two barns, all built during the 1824-1850 plantation period. An overgrown terraced garden in its original configuration as constructed around 1855 stands to the west of the house. Dowden's Luck was listed on the National Register of Historic Places in 1988.

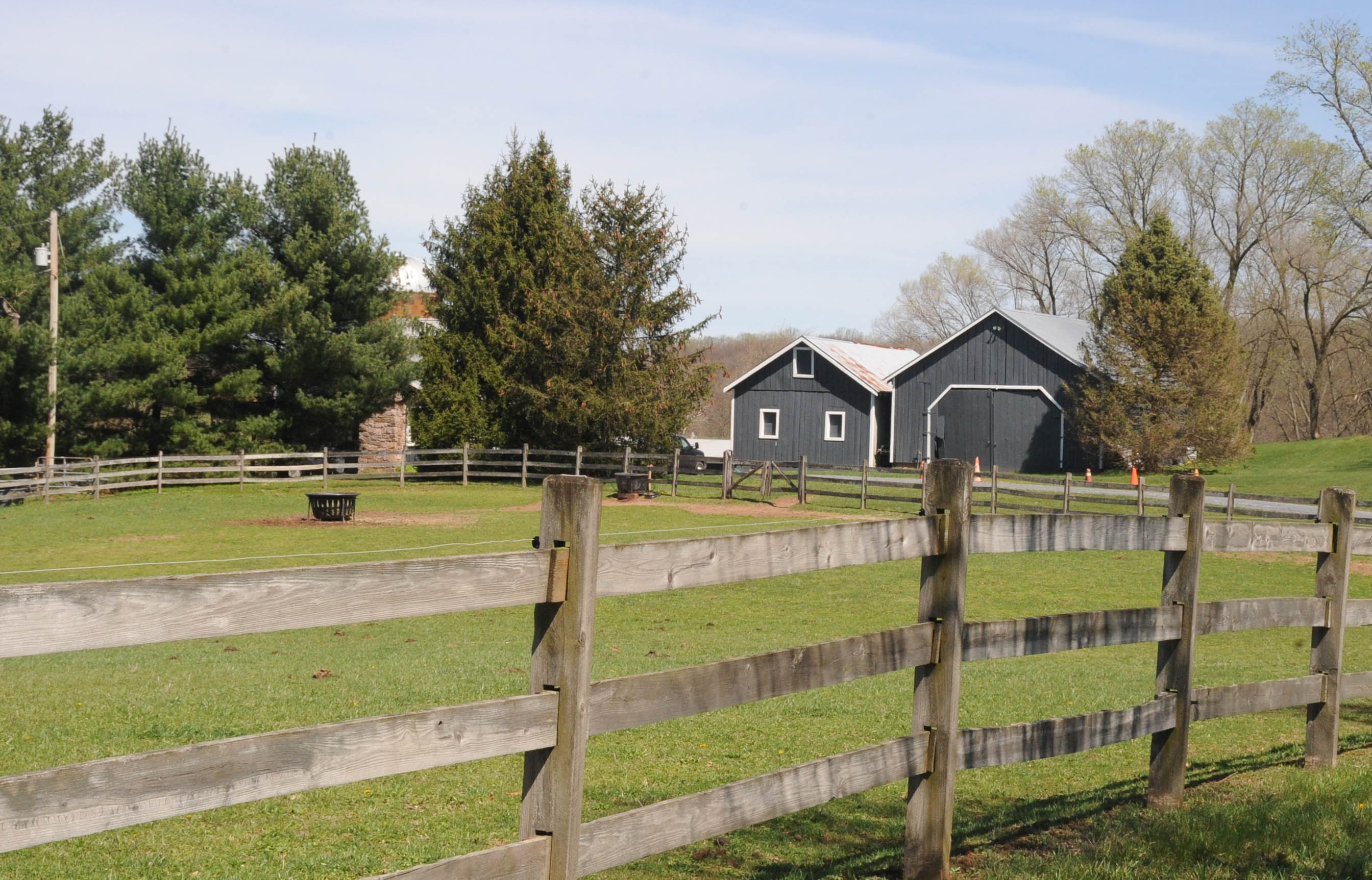
Modern barns
