= Valhalla (Poolesville, Maryland) =

Historic house in Maryland, United States

- U.S. National Register of Historic Places
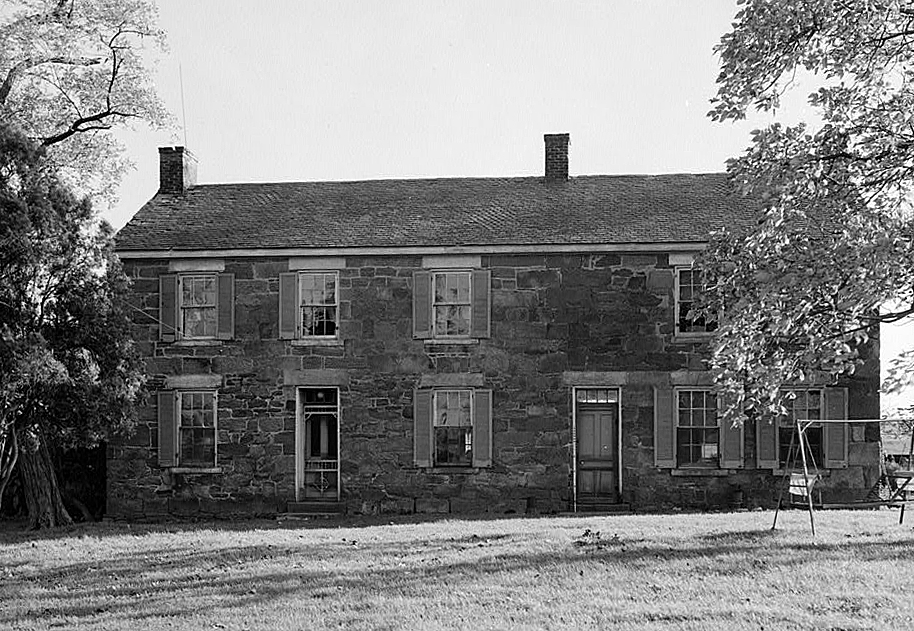
- Valhalla in 1936

- Location within Maryland Location within the United States
- Location: 19010 Fisher Avenue (MD 107), Poolesville, Maryland
- Coordinates: 39°7′51″N 77°23′51″W
- Area: 10 acres (4.0 ha)
- Built: 1835
- NRHP reference No.: 82002818
- Added to NRHP: March 15, 1982

Valhalla, also known as Rosedale, is a historic home located at Poolesville, Montgomery County, Maryland, United States. It is a two-story house constructed of local Seneca sandstone, to which are attached a c. 1835 1 1/2-story log structure, and two small 20th-century one-story frame wings.

Valhalla was listed on the National Register of Historic Places in 1982.
