= Darnall Place =

Historic house in Maryland, United States

- U.S. National Register of Historic Places
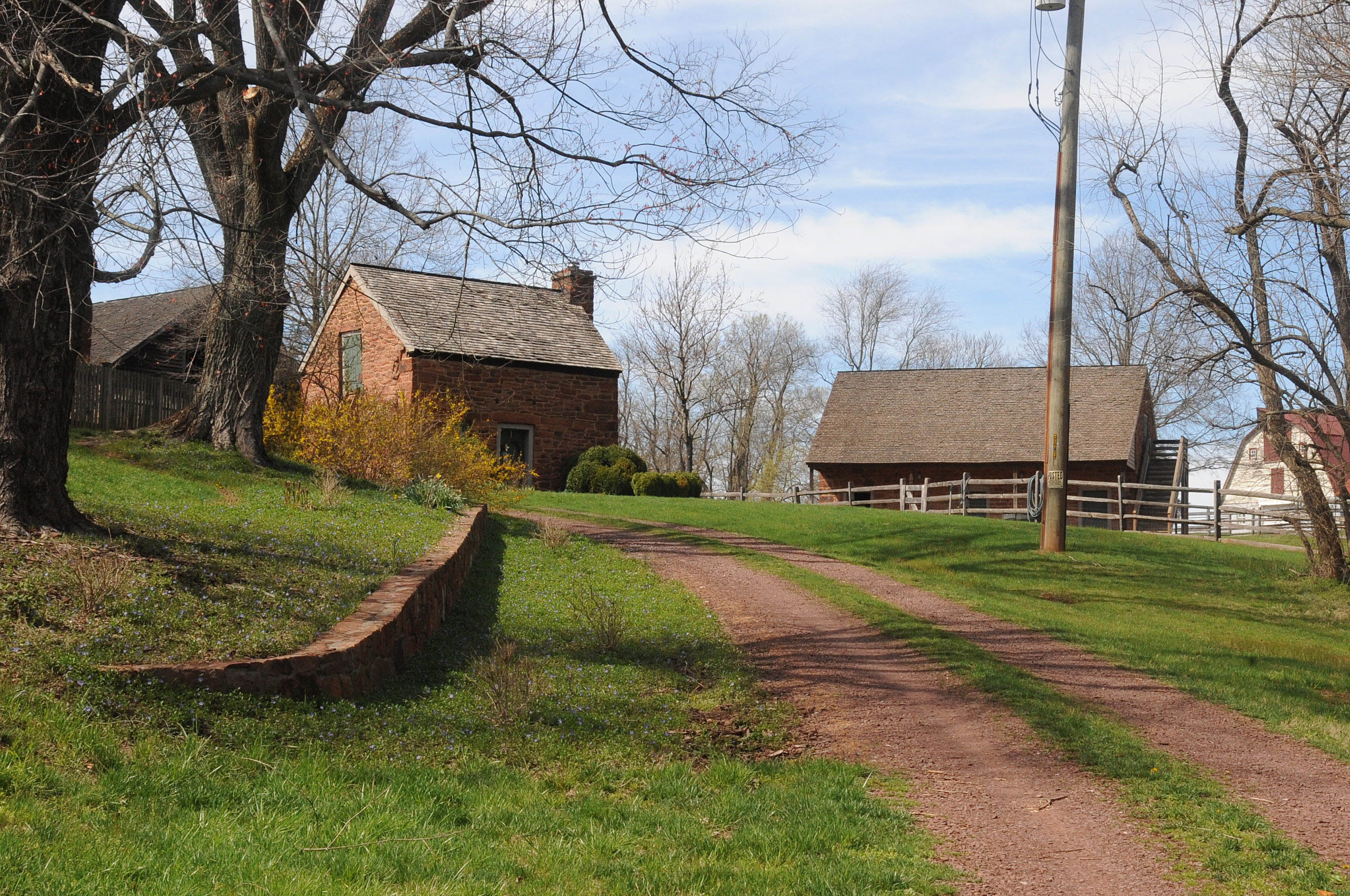
- Darnall Place in 2017

- Location within Maryland Location within the United States
- Location: 17615 White's Ferry Road (MD 107), Poolesville, Maryland
- Coordinates: 39°7′33″N 77°22′4″W
- Area: 18 acres (7.3 ha)
- Built: 1804
- NRHP reference No.: 79001140
- Added to NRHP: August 13, 1979

Darnall Place is a historic farm complex located at Poolesville, Montgomery County, Maryland, United States. The farm complex consists of four small 18th-century stone buildings, a 19th-century frame wagon shed/corn crib, a 20th-century concrete block barn, and three late-19th- or early-20th-century frame sheds. The stone buildings are all constructed of red-brown Seneca sandstone. The one-story dwelling has a large external stone chimney on the east end. The farmstead is reminiscent of those in Europe or the British Isles.

Darnall Place was listed on the National Register of Historic Places in 1979.

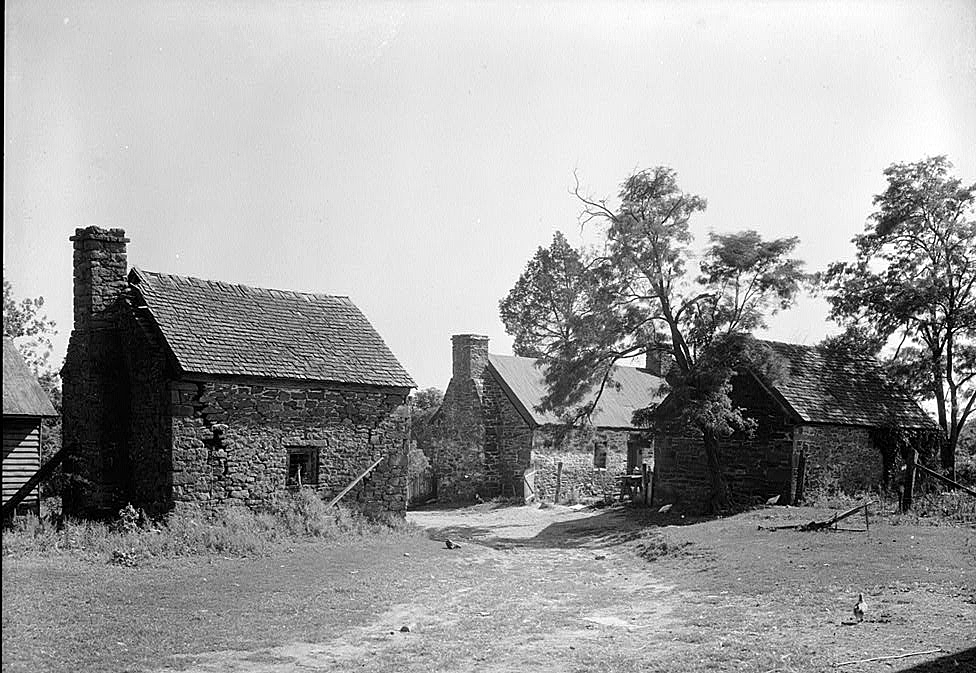
In 1936

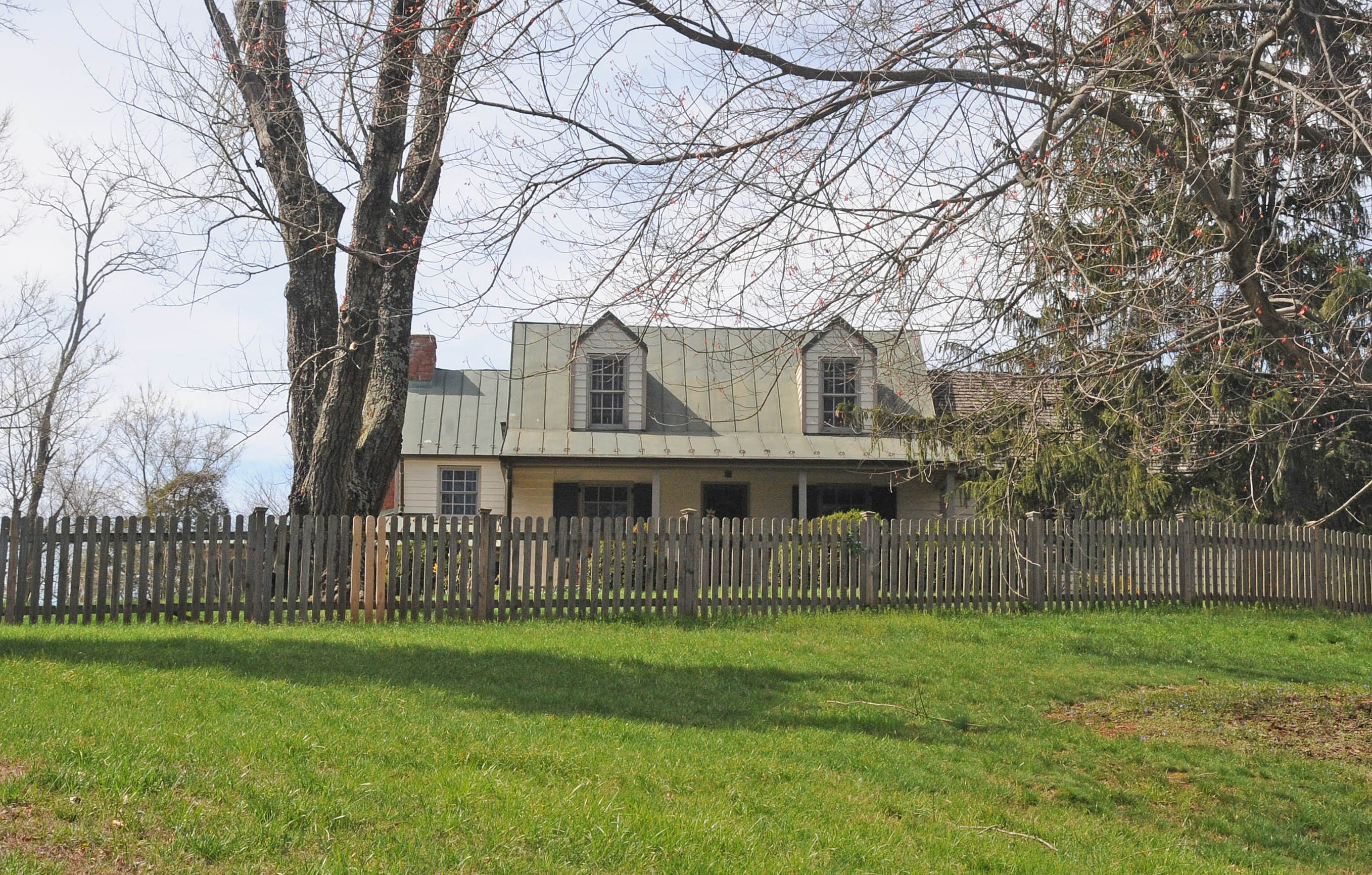

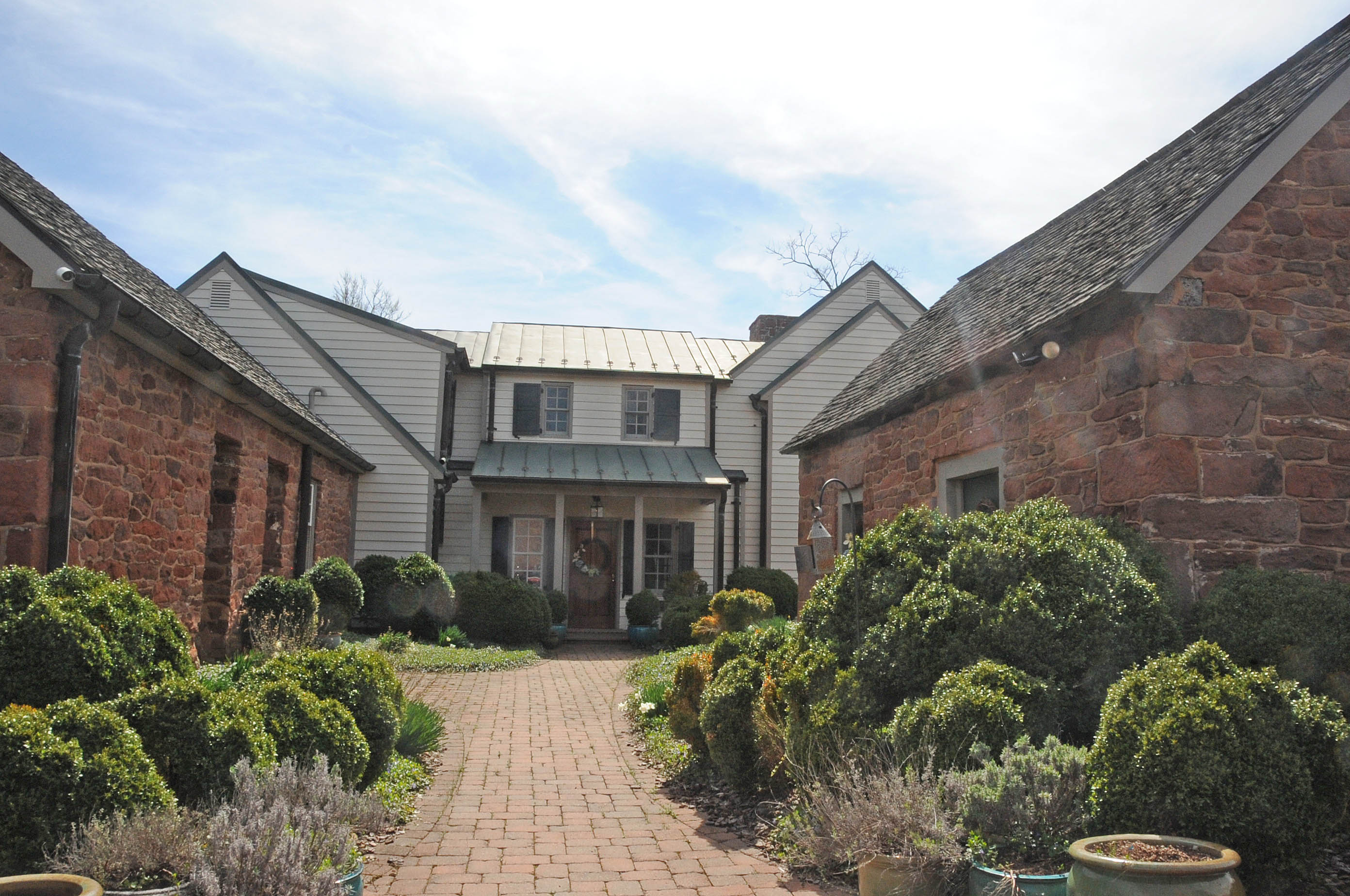
Courtyard with modern house in center
