= Darby Store =

Coordinates: 39°10′45″N 77°24′47″W

- Interactive map of the Darby Store area

General information
- Location: 19801 Darnestown Road in Beallsville, Maryland, U.S.

The Darby Store, also known as the Darby Store Cultural Park, is a historic site located on Medley's Hill at 19801 Darnestown Road in Beallsville, Maryland that is part of the Beallsville Historic District. What is now the intersection of Beallsville Road and Darnestown Road/(Route 28) was formerly the Brewer Farm. In 1908, H.C. Darby bought the land. In 1910, H.C. Darby built a two-story general store. In the 19th and 20th century it was very common to have the family residence next to the family business, and the Darby House was built in 1921.

In 2004, the Maryland-National Capital Park and Planning Commission purchased the property and restoration by BELL Architects was ongoing through 2015. The general store is culturally and historically significant as one of the few remaining examples of rural vernacular architecture of the early 20th century in Montgomery County. During the summer of 2009, the site was under excavation. A team of archaeologists spent three weeks at the site and their findings included: oyster shells, glass shards, coal, nails, ceramic pipe stems, a 1918 liberty dime, and a Yoo-hoo bottle, all of which provide clues to the history of the area, and the buildings occupying it since the 19th century.
