= Chiswell's Inheritance =

Historic house in Maryland, United States

- U.S. National Register of Historic Places
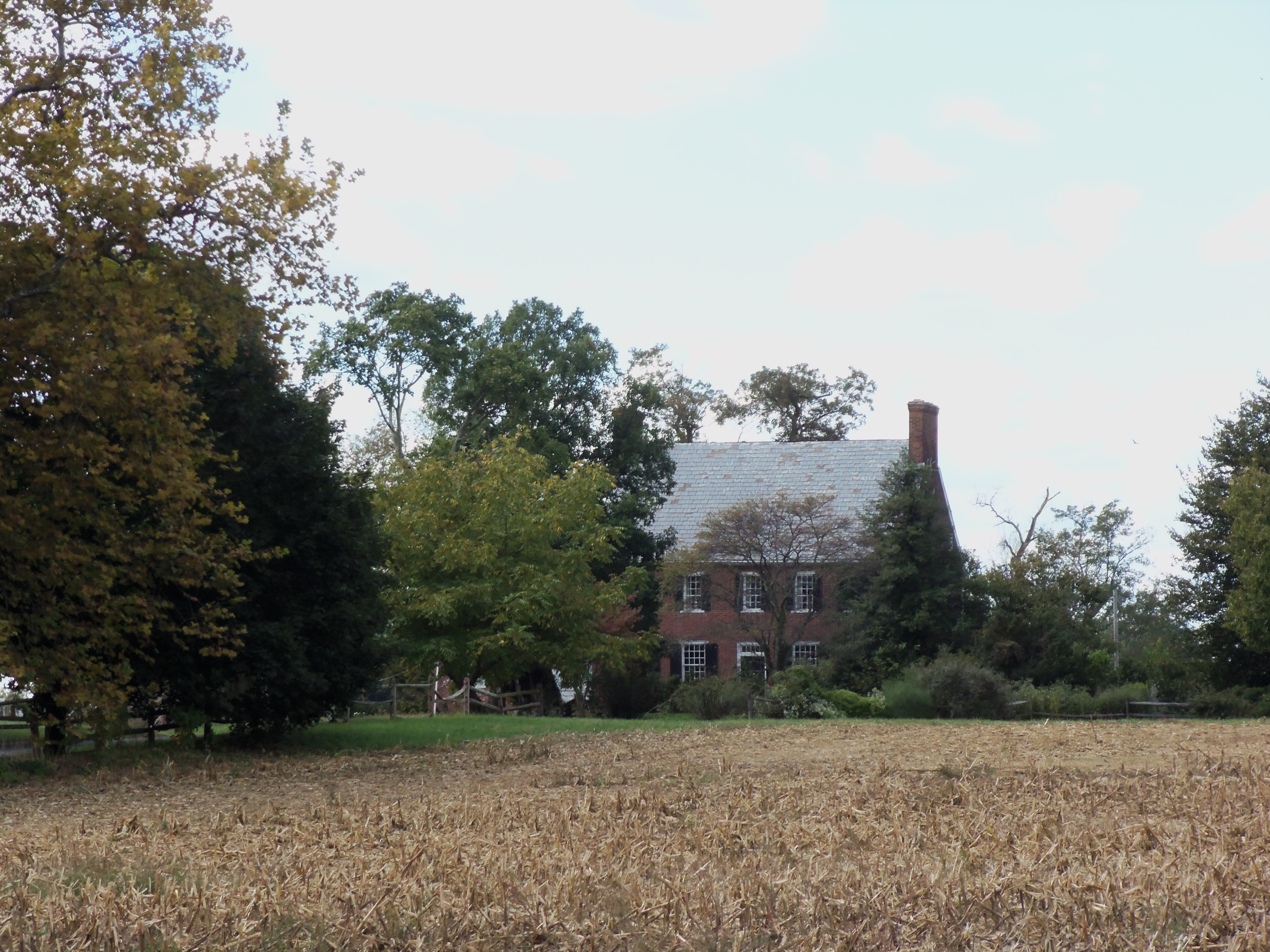
- Chiswell's Inheritance, September 2012

- Location within Maryland Location within the United States
- Location: 18200 Beallsville Road, Poolesville, Maryland
- Coordinates: 39°9′11″N 77°25′24″W
- Area: 135 acres (55 ha)
- Built: 1796
- NRHP reference No.: 74000960
- Added to NRHP: September 10, 1974

Chiswell's Inheritance, also known as Chiswell's Manor, Chiswell's Delight and Grayhaven Manor, is a historic home located at Poolesville, Montgomery County, Maryland, United States. It is a two-story, five-bay brick plantation house with an attached kitchen wing on the south end. Inlaid in glazed brick near the peak of the gable is the inscription "C S" with the date "1796" below.

Chiswell's Inheritance was listed on the National Register of Historic Places in 1974.

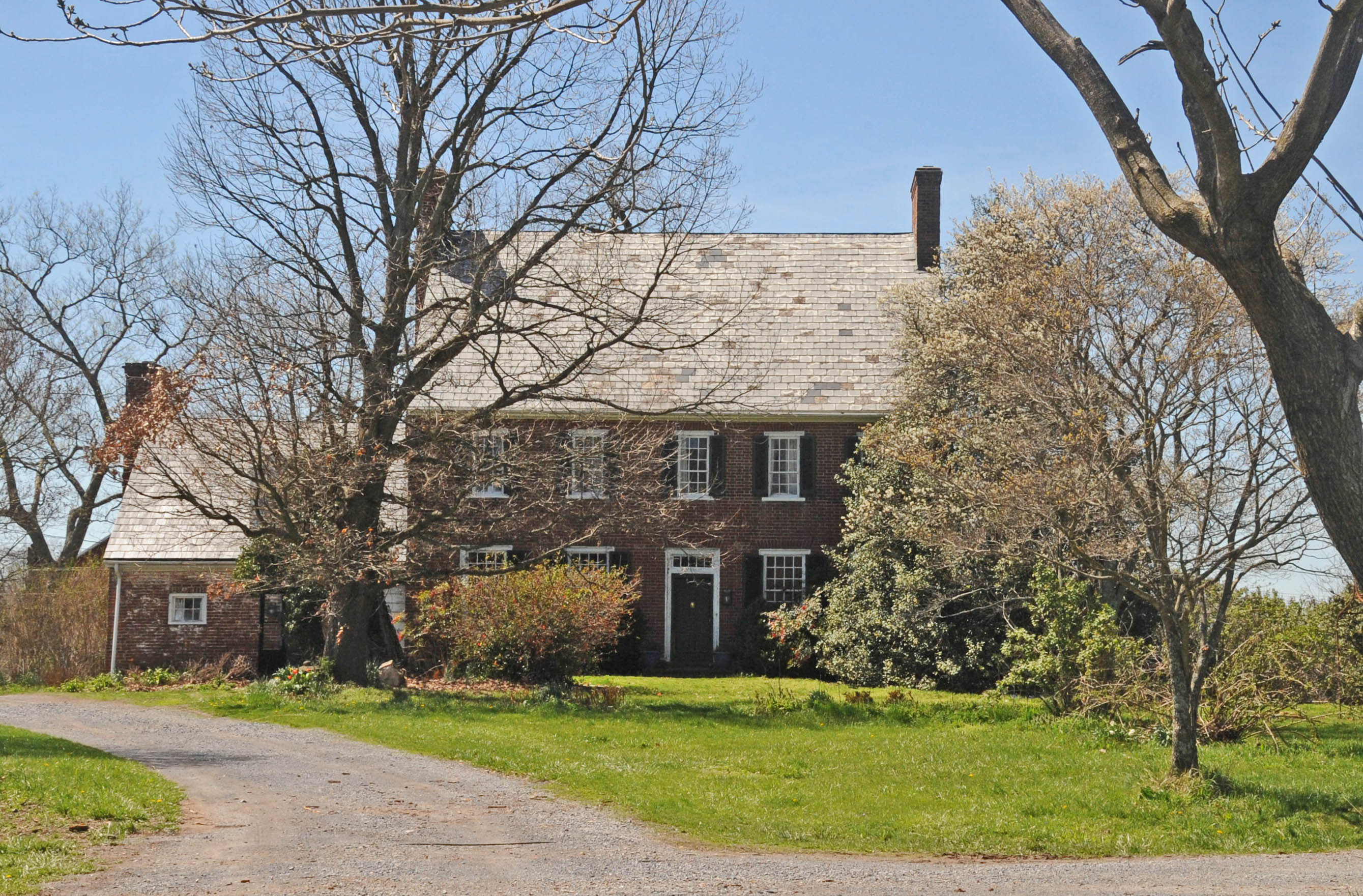
