= Multi-Housing News =

Defunct American magazine

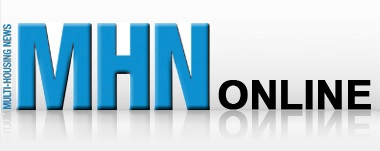
- MHN Logo
- Format: Website
- Owner(s): MultiHousingNews.com
- Founder(s): Gralla Publications
- Founded: 1966; 59 years ago
- Language: English
- Headquarters: 370 Lexington Avenue Suite 2100, New York, NY
- Sister newspapers: Commercial Property Executive
- ISSN: 0146-0919
- Website: www.multihousingnews.com
- Free online archives: MHN Digital Edition Archive

Multi-Housing News (MHN) is an online publication focused on the apartment industry. It was also a print magazine between 1966 and July 2012.

== History ==
=== Apartment Construction News ===
The magazine was started in 1966, as Apartment Construction News. Wesley Wise was hired as the magazine's first editor-in-chief.

In 1991, Gralla Publications merged with Miller Freeman Publications to create Miller Freeman, Inc. Nine years later, Dutch publishing company VNU acquired Miller Freeman, Inc. for $650 million in cash. VNU changed its name to Nielsen Holdings in 2007.
