= Poolesville High School =

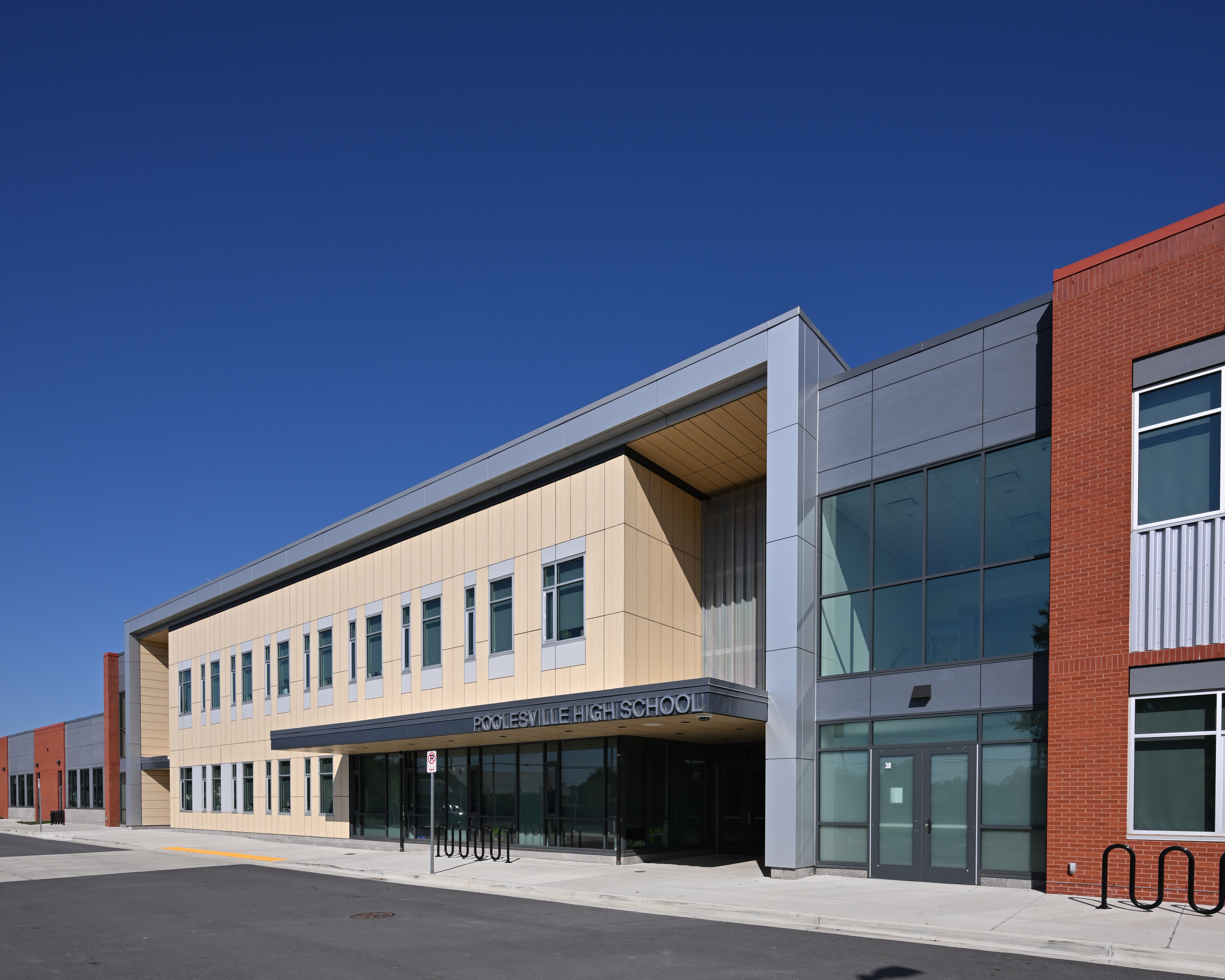

Location
- 17501 W Willard Rd; Poolesville, Maryland 20837; United States; 39°8′36″N 77°25′6″W

Information
- Type: Public magnet high school
- Established: 1911; 115 years ago
- School district: Montgomery County Public Schools
- CEEB code: 210825
- NCES School ID: 240048000897
- Principal: Mark Carothers
- Faculty: 71.02 FTE (2022-23)
- Grades: 9–12
- Gender: Coeducational
- Enrollment: 1,309 (2022-23)
- Student to teacher ratio: 18.43:1
- Campus type: Fringe town
- Colors: Black; Vegas gold
- Athletics conference: AA
- Mascot: Falcons
- USNWR ranking: 272
- Newspaper: The Poolesville Pulse
- Yearbook: The Echo
- Website: montgomeryschoolsmd.org/schools/poolesvillehs

Poolesville High School is a public magnet high school located in Poolesville, Maryland, United States. It is part of the Montgomery County Public Schools system. It is the only all-magnet high school in Montgomery County.

== Rankings and scores ==
In 2026, U.S. News & World Report ranked Poolesville as the #4 high school in Maryland and #272 nationwide.

Poolesville students average a score of 1328 on the SAT, averaging 664 on the verbal section and 665 on the math section.

== History ==
The core of the building was built in 1911 as an elementary school, and as of 1912 the school was the only consolidated (middle and high school) in Montgomery County. Poolesville's first graduates were seven students in 1920.

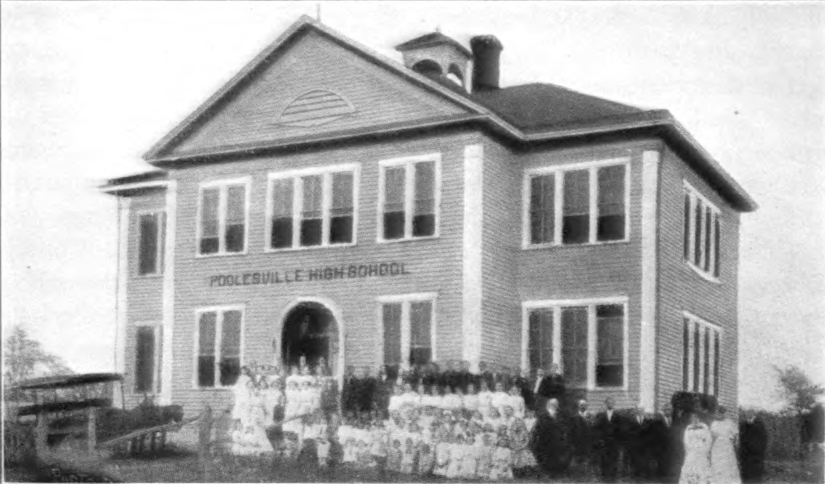
Poolesville High School circa 1912

The current school building dates back to 1953, but has had over 22 additions made since then, with the last major revision happening in 1978. The building housed Poolesville's middle school and high school up until 1997 when John Poole Middle School was built.

By 2013, Poolesville residents were campaigning for a reconstruction of the school building, due to issues such as overcrowding, poor infrastructure and design, fumes from asbestos in the walls, and overall dilapidation. The major renovation was included in MCPS' 2013-2018 Capital Improvement Program, until it was shelved in 2017 following county budget cuts, to the frustration of Poolesville parents and students. Campaigns for a renovation, notably from the nonprofit MoCo Innovation, continued until the Board of Education eventually planned and funded the project again in 2021. Construction started in 2022 and is expected to finish by the start of the 2024-25 academic year. Once complete, the new high school building will be about 234,000 square feet and will have an increased capacity of 1,508 students from the current 1,170.

=== Mascot ===
Until 2002, the school's mascot was an Indian, and its logo was the profile of an Indian warrior in a full headdress. In 2001, amid some controversy, the school's students and Poolesville Community voted on whether to keep the mascot or to change it to a falcon. Although the students and community elected to keep the Indian as the mascot, at the beginning of the 2001–2002 school year, the Montgomery County Board of Education, under pressure from the Maryland Bureau of Indian Affairs, overruled the vote, paying the school $80,000 to change its mascot. Beginning in the 2002–2003 school year, the students voted to change the school's mascot to a falcon.

== Admissions ==
Enrollment by Race/Ethnicity 2022–2023
White	Asian	Hispanic	Black	Two or More Races	American Indian/Alaska Native
527	476	139	93	69	3

Year	Enrollment	Native American/ Alaskan Native	%	Asian/ Pacific Islander	%	African American	%	Non-Hispanic White	%	Hispanic	%
2021-22	1,272	2	0.2	462	36.3	76	6.0	539	42.4	123	9.7
2020-21	1,236		<5		34.9		5.9		44.6		9.1
2019-20	1,205		<5		32.9		5.6		48.2		7.8
2018-19	1,185		<5		31.5		5.7		48.9		8.2
2017-18	1,183		<5		30.0		5.5		50.8		7.7
2016-17	1,180		<5		30.1		<5		51.4		7.6
2015-16	1,205		<5		28.5		5.1		51.5		8.0
2014-15	1,223		<5		25.8		5.7		54.5		6.9
2013-14	1,202		<5		25.6		5.2		56.1		7.3
2012–13	1,235	3	0.2	286	23.1	62	5	717	58	99	8
2011-12	1,194		<5		23.1		5.4		59.5		7.2
2010-11	1,170		0.2		23.2		4.8		60.0		7.4
2009–10	1,150	6	0.5	243	21.1	70	6.1	768	66.8	63	5.5
2008–09	1,049	8	0.8	186	17.7	60	5.7	750	71.5	45	4.3
2007–08	1,012	8	0.8	127	12.6	50	4.9	790	78.0	37	3.7
2006–07	939	5	0.1	69	7.34	54	5.8	777	82.7	34	3.6
2005–06	861	3	0.2	32	3.44	46	5.3	757	87.9	23	2.7
2004–05	825	4	0.4	35	3.34	35	4.2	728	88.2	23	2.8
2003–04	776	3	0.1	35	3.21	29	3.7	696	89.7	13	1.7
2002–03	753	3	0.2	28	2.98	23	3.1	682	90.6	17	2.3

== Curriculum ==
Starting in the 2006–2007 school year, honor students in northern Montgomery County ("upcounty") have the opportunity to become a part of one of three magnet programs called "houses": Global Ecology; Humanities; or Science, Math, and Computer Science. Students test into high school during their last year of middle school, and if accepted and enrolled, they are "certificate" students and are required to take the standard courses for their specific program. As Poolesville is considered a whole magnet high school, resident students (if they do not apply and join one of the other programs) automatically become part of a fourth program called the Independent Studies program or ISP but are "non-certificate" and can choose to take specialized courses. The Independent Studies Program is specifically for Poolesville resident students only and cannot be applied for by out-of-district students.

Poolesville was ranked Washington Post's #1 Most Challenging High School in Maryland in 2016, U.S. News' #1 Best High School in Maryland, and Newsweek's #1 Top High School in Maryland in 2015. The school's science, technology, engineering, and mathematics (STEM) program was ranked #121 in Newsweek's 2019 nationwide survey of US high schools.

== Areas served ==
While most of Poolesville's students come from outside of Poolesville, there is a local student population which comes from one middle school, John Poole MS, and two elementary schools, Monocacy and Poolesville ES.

== Athletics ==
Poolesville fields teams in the following sports:

- Baseball
- Basketball (boys' and girls')
  - Girls' basketball went 27 and 0 in 2017–2018. They won the 2A States championship game.
- Bocce
- Beltway league
- Cross country (boys' and girls')
- Cheerleading
- Field hockey
- FIRST Robotics
- Football
- Golf (boys' and girls')
- History Bowl
- Indoor track and field (boys' and girls')
- Lacrosse (boys' and girls')
- Poms
- Quizbowl
- Soccer (boys' and girls')
- Softball
- Swimming (boys' and girls')
  - The Falcons won six state titles (four by the boys' team and two by the girls' team) from 2012 to 2015 under two-time Washington Post Coach of the Year Jon Leong.
- Tennis (boys' and girls')
- Track and field (boys' and girls')
- Volleyball (boys', girls', and coed)
- Wrestling

== Notable alumni ==
- Matthew Heimbach, white nationalist and founder of the Traditionalist Worker Party
- Irvin Smith, football player
- Filip Burnett, professional soccer player
- Robert Huang, professional League of Legends eSports player (C9 Blaber)
- David Riedman, data scientist and professor
