= Transferable development rights =

Concept in American planning law

Transferable development rights (TDR) is a method by which developers can purchase the development rights of certain parcels within a designated "sending district" and transfer the rights to another "receiving district" to increase the density of their new development. The underlying legal concept of a transfer of development rights programme is the notion that all land has a bundle of property rights. It is used for controlling land use to complement land-use planning and zoning for more effective urban growth management and land conservation.

== Description ==
The TDR process can be considered a tool for controlling urban sprawl by concentrating development. TDR is a legal mechanism offered in some local government jurisdictions as a form of development control. In the United States, TDR are also a way to avoid constitutional takings issues caused by rezoning areas that would otherwise eliminate a significant amount of value from the property. The procedure offers landowners financial incentives or bonuses for the conservation and maintenance of the environmental, heritage or agricultural values of their land. TDR is based on the concept that with land ownership comes the right of use of land, or land development. These land-based development rights can in some jurisdictions be used, unused, sold, or otherwise transferred by the owner of a parcel.

Sending districts are commonly made up of areas with desirable traits that are at risk of being developed such as agricultural lands or wilderness areas, but may also be newly designated historic sites. Alternatively, parcels with buildings that do not use all of their available size have "excess" developable capacity that can be conveyed to other parcels, possibly adjoining the first parcels.

Receiving districts are typically are located in urban areas that are ripe for development. Receiving districts are generally areas more suited for higher density developments and sending districts are areas with environmental, heritage or agricultural values that the county, city or town wishes to preserve.

TDR credit banks can be used to store development rights that have been purchased, if a receiving area development project has not yet been identified. This mechanism is used when the time of the sale in the sending area is not concurrent with a development in the receiving area. It is also useful in communities that have the opportunity to purchase the rights from an area of high conservation interest but do not have a development project that can receive higher density at the time. In Massachusetts it is recommended that TDR credit banks be operated by a third party organization that is empowered to negotiate the sale of development rights, such as a non-profit organization or an agency operating within the community.

== Notable examples ==
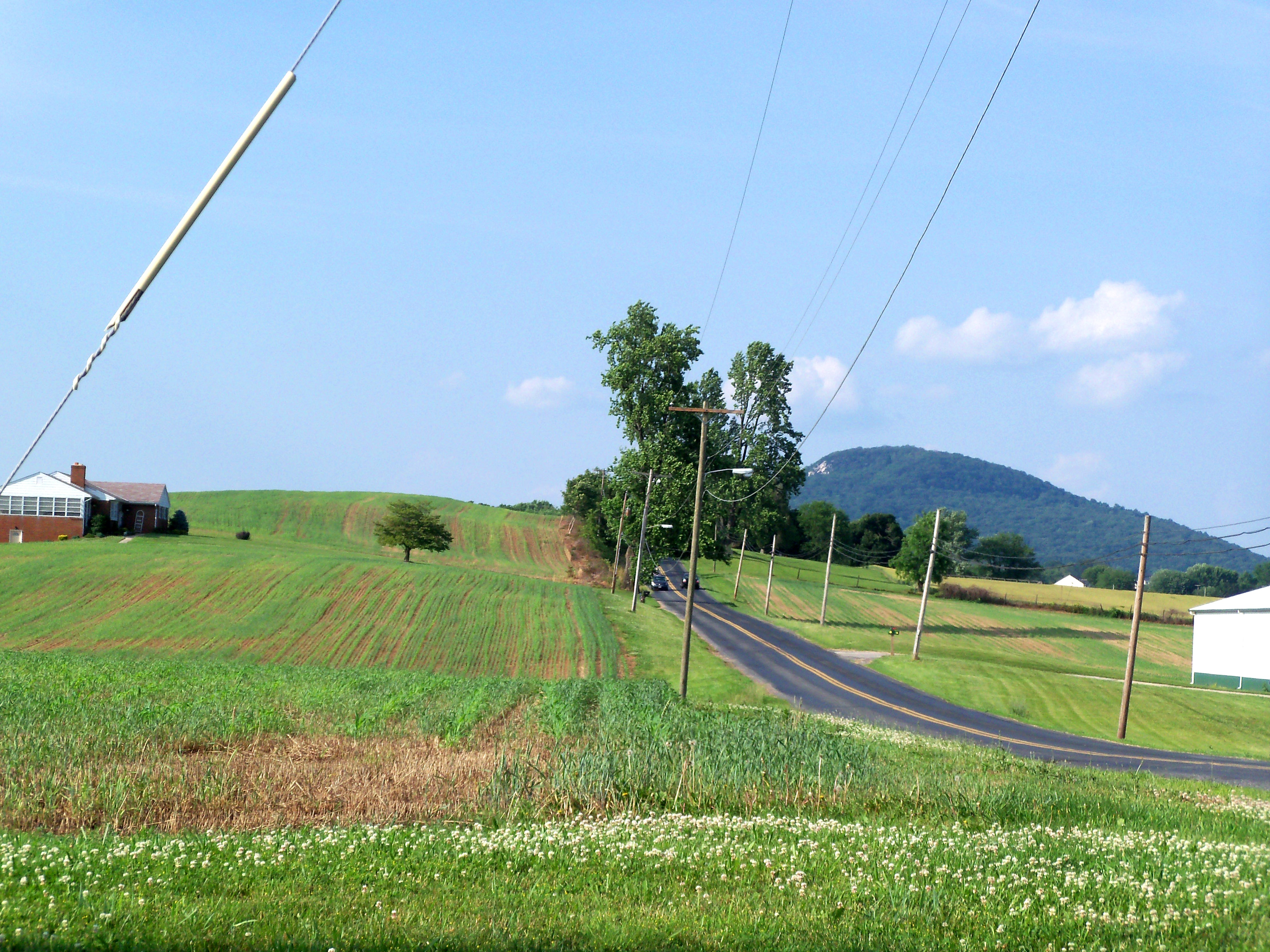
Preserved land in the Montgomery County, Maryland Agricultural Reserve

A widely-noted example of districted TDRs is the Montgomery County, Maryland Agricultural Reserve. TDR programs have been implemented in over 200 U.S. communities, in several states, including Colorado, Massachusetts, Virginia and Washington. New York City has limits to the air rights of each building, but those are freely transferable.

One of the most famous examples of a TDR is in the case of Penn Central Transportation Co. v. New York City (1978). The United States Supreme Court held that the city's Landmarks Preservation Commission did not deny the owners of Grand Central Terminal all economic value by denying them the right to build an office building above the station. The terminal owners possessed air rights which could be used as a TDR to build higher than the conventional zoning allowed on their other properties.

== See also ==
- Comprehensive planning
- Environmental planning
