= Poolesville Historic District =

Historic district in Maryland, United States

- U.S. National Register of Historic Places
- U.S. Historic district
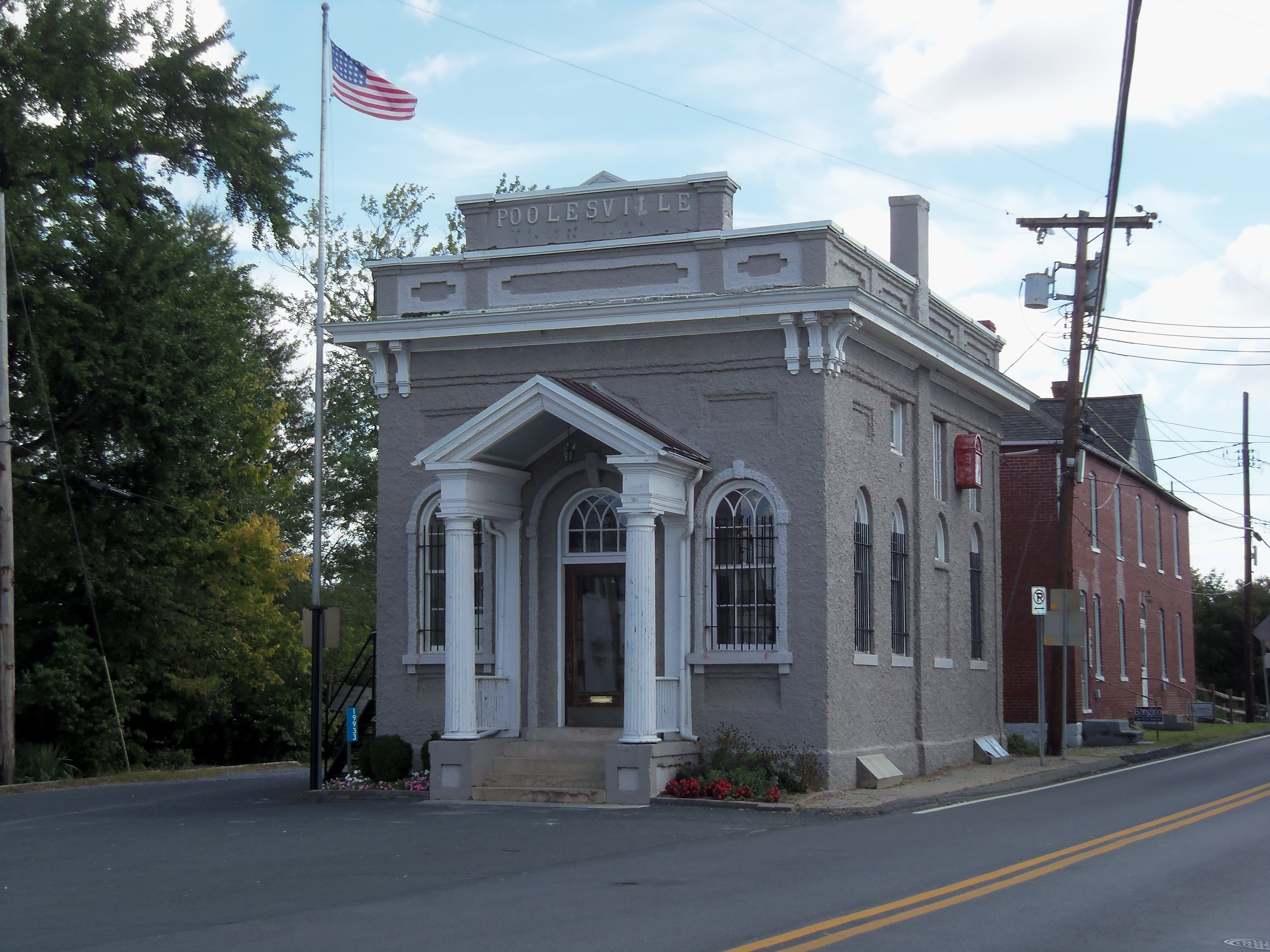

- Location within Maryland Location within the United States
- Location: Area around the junctions of Maryland Route 107, Maryland Route 109, and Willard Rd., Poolesville, Maryland
- Coordinates: 39°8′50″N 77°24′53″W
- Area: 98 acres (40 ha)
- Built: 1785
- Built by: Beeding, Craven P.
- Architectural style: Bungalow/craftsman, Late Victorian, Federal
- NRHP reference No.: 75000913
- Added to NRHP: May 29, 1975

The Poolesville Historic District is a national historic district located at Poolesville, Montgomery County, Maryland. It consists of 33 buildings of local architectural and historical significance including structures representing a diversity of styles, materials, and uses, and includes residential, ecclesiastical, and commercial architecture, as well as an assorted number of small domestic dependencies, such as dairies and smokehouses.

It was listed on the National Register of Historic Places in 1975.
