= Beallsville, Maryland =

Community in Montgomery County, Maryland, United States

Coordinates: 39°10′44″N 77°24′46″W

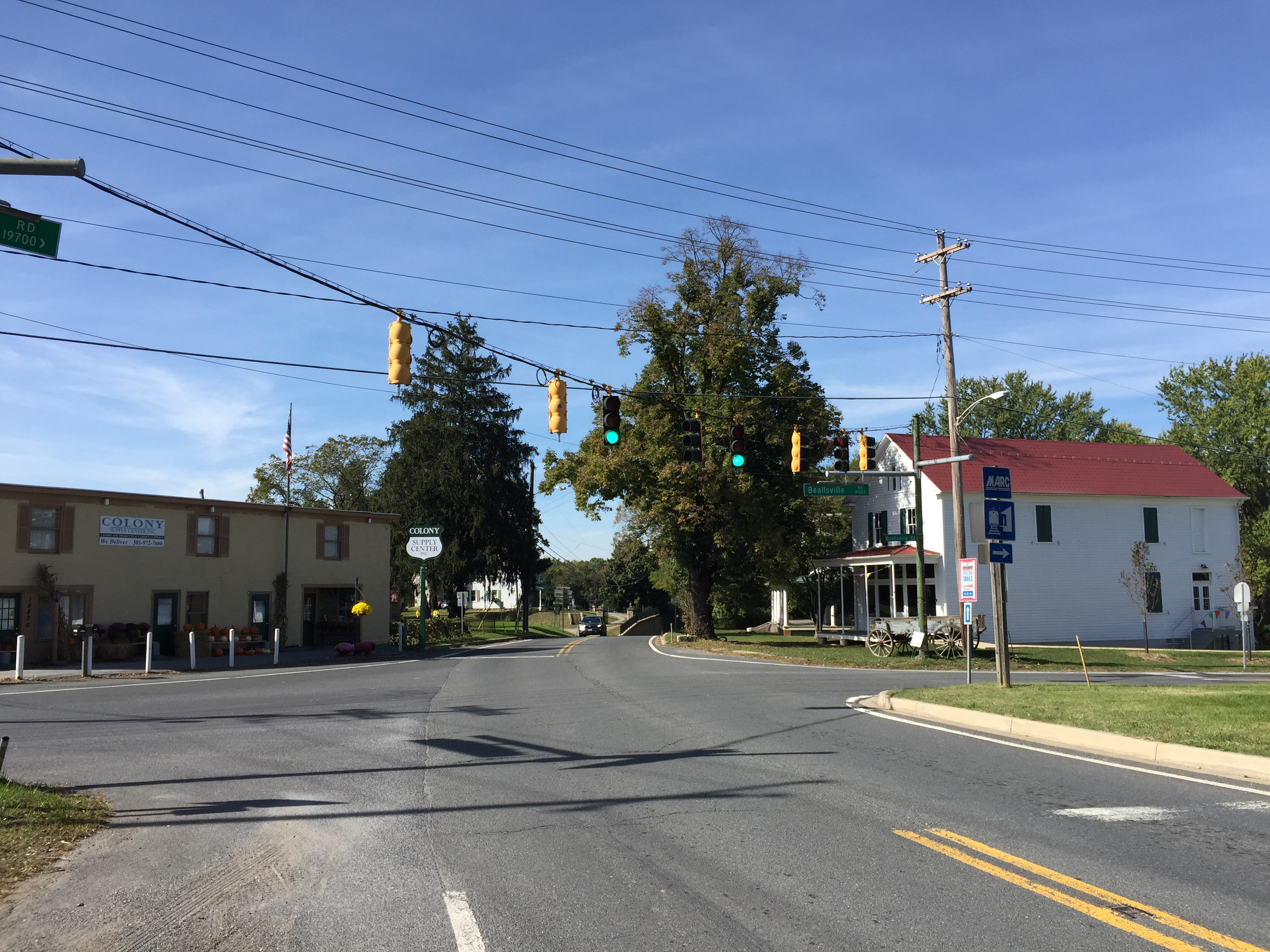
Central Beallsville

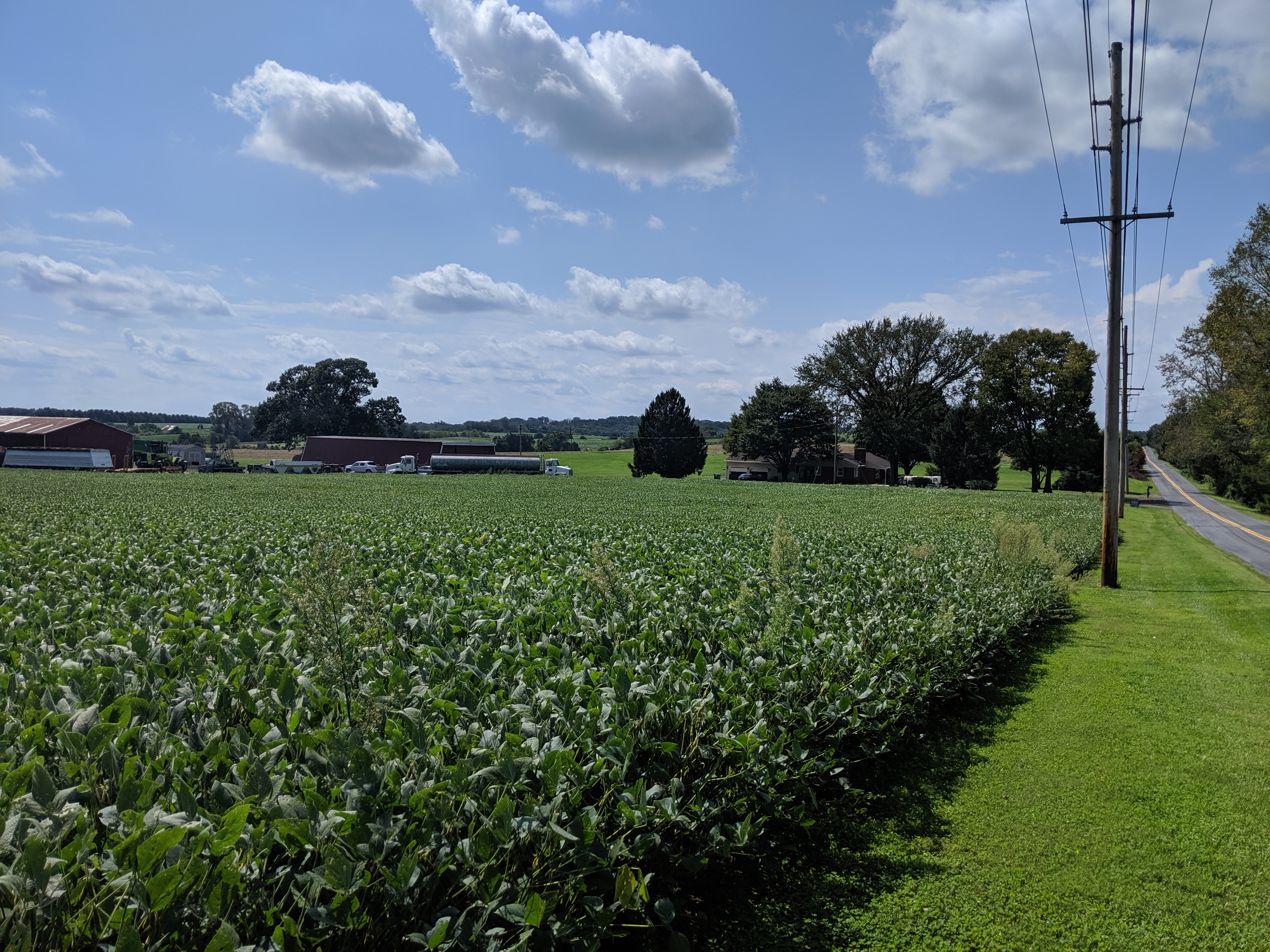
A farm in Beallsville

Beallsville is an unincorporated community in Montgomery County, Maryland, United States. It is a small community located north of Poolesville. The ZIP Code for Beallsville is 20839.

== Darby Store ==
The Darby Store is located at the intersection of Beallsville and Darnestown roads. It is a historic and cultural landmark. In the mid-1800s the site of Darby store was occupied by a small blacksmith store and shop. However, in 1908, the shop was demolished after Harry C. Darby bought the land. By 1910, Darby built the 2 1/2-story general store where local residents bought supplies and picked up mail. Darby store closed in 1974, and remained fully intact until a tractor-trailer destroyed the front porch in the late 1980s.

In 2004, the Maryland-National Capital Park and Planning Commission bought the Store and Darby house for $670,000, a year after the Montgomery Preservation nonprofit agency declared the building “one of the county’s most endangered historic sites.”

Julie Mueller, cultural resources planner for Montgomery County claimed that the structure would be moved back from the corner next year. During the summer of 2009, the site was under excavation. A team of archaeologists spent three weeks at the site and their findings included: oyster shells, glass shards, coal, nails, ceramic pipe stems, a 1918 liberty dime, and a Yoo-hoo bottle, all of which provide clues to the history of the area, and the buildings occupying it since the 19th century.

== Monocacy Cemetery ==
The Monocacy Cemetery is located at 19801 W Hunter Rd. This old cemetery dates back to the American Revolution, although none of the known burials are that old. The cemetery is the final resting place for about 6,000 persons from Beallsville, Poolesville, and the surrounding area.

Located in the upper West area of Montgomery County, near to Sugarloaf Mountain, is this secluded and historic place.

Monocacy Cemetery occupies the property that was the former Chapel of Ease of All Saints parish of Frederick County, known as Monocacy Chapel, which stood as early as 1747 in which prayers for peace were offered during the Revolutionary War.

In 1770, when the parish of Montgomery expanded, the St. Peter's Episcopal Church took possession. During the War of 1812, it became a camping ground for the American forces.

In 1849, the congregation moved to a new church in Poolesville, leaving the old church to fall into ruins. In January 1872, the vestry of St. Peter's transferred the churchyard over to the newly formed Monocacy Cemetery Society of Montgomery County, which included Frederick Sprigg Poole, Dr. N. Brewer, William Wallace Poole, Howard Griffith, Nathan White Allnutt, John A. Jones, and Isaac Young. Burials began taking place shortly afterward, though there are many stones from the original chapel still surrounding the rebuilt chapel.

The cemetery has been documented in a book, Monocacy Cemetery Beallsville, Montgomery County, Maryland by Elizabeth R. Frain. The book is based on all the available records of the cemetery and includes Interment Books, Burial Permits, card files and tombstones.

== Beallsville during the Civil War ==
In the latter part of 1861, Union soldiers were encamped in the small town of Beallsville, known at the time as Monocacy Church. The 1748 Anglican "Chapel of Ease" from which the town acquired its name was nearly destroyed by the Union occupation. Beallsville was a crossroads on the road from Rockville to the Monocacy River and Nolands ferry, making it a strategic spot for the Union.

As part of the Maryland Campaign, in September 1862, Illinois and Indiana cavalry met units from Virginia in Beallsville after becoming engaged the day before in Poolesville. The engagement resulted in two Virginian dead, and the capture of their captain and six other enlisted men.

On October 12, 1862, a second cavalry battle took place in Beallsville. As part of Gen. J.E.B. Stuart's second ride around the Army of the Potomac, Stuart was returning to White's Ford and confronted by Federal forces based out of Beallsville, a mile north of the Chapel. Confederate artillery held the Federal troops and Stuart was able to cross the Potomac.

After the war, the E.V. White Chapter of the United Daughters of the Confederacy rebuilt Monocacy Church in the Monocacy cemetery. A celebration commemorating the birthday of Jefferson Davis was held every June 3 at the cemetery.
