= Hyattstown, Maryland =

Unincorporated community in Montgomery County, Maryland, United States

Coordinates: 39°16′58″N 77°18′53″W

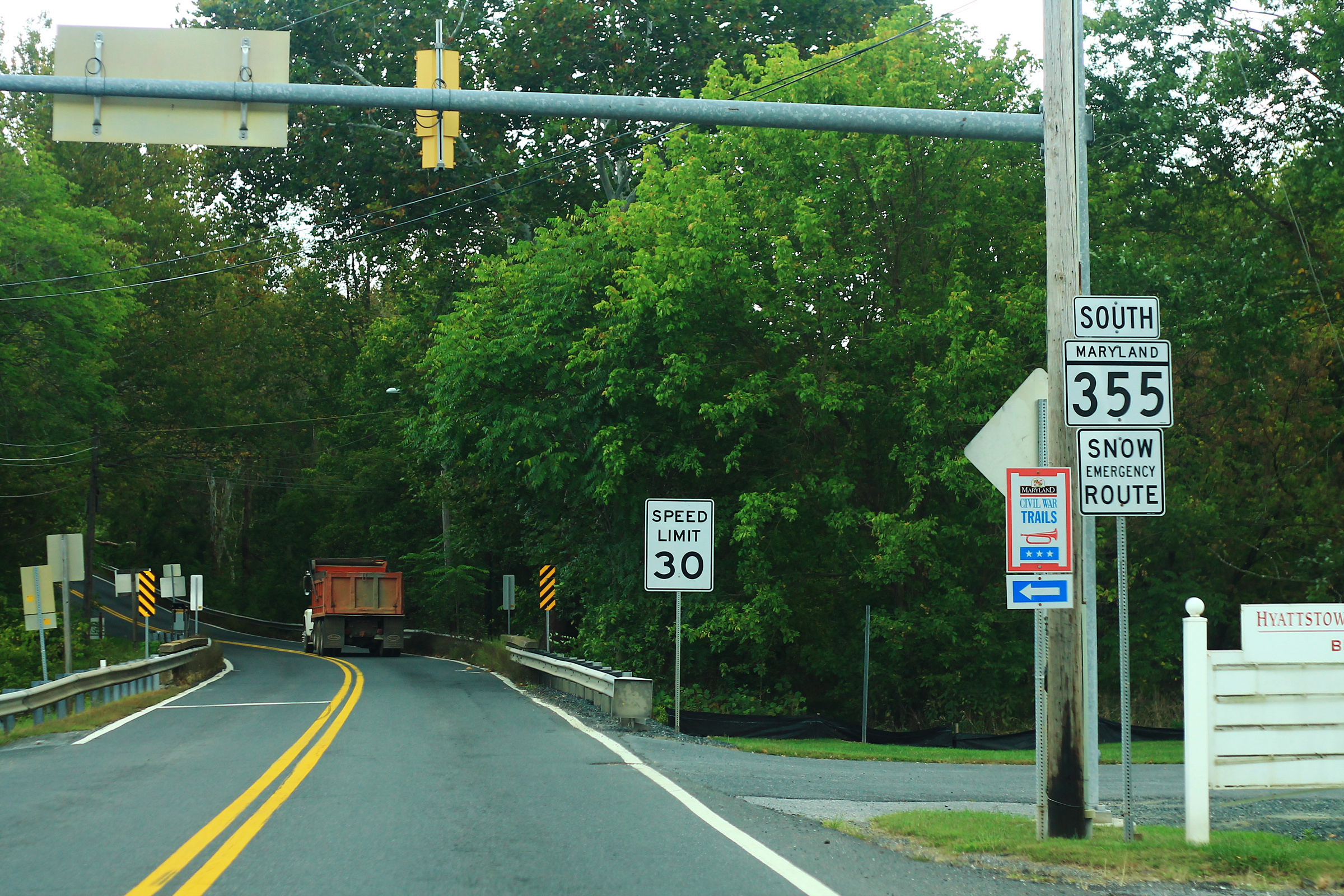
Road sign in Hyattstown

Hyattstown is an unincorporated community in Montgomery County, Maryland, United States. It is located on Maryland Route 355 in upper Montgomery County, not far from the border with Frederick County.

Established in 1798 by founder Jesse Hyatt, the town featured the Hyattstown Inn, a one-room school-house, a butcher, a blacksmith, and other commercial venues. These historical commercial buildings are now private homes.

Quarries nearby supplied slate for roofing the old United States Capitol in Washington, D.C.

Hyattstown was the location of an 1862 Civil War artillery battle between General Nathaniel Prentice Banks' troops and General Stonewall Jackson's troops.

Hyattstown Christian Church, a Disciples of Christ congregation established in 1840, still operates today.

The old station building (ca. 1895) for the Rock Creek Railway and Kensington Railway streetcar lines was moved to Hyattstown from Chevy Chase in 1980.
