= Poolesville, Maryland =

- Town
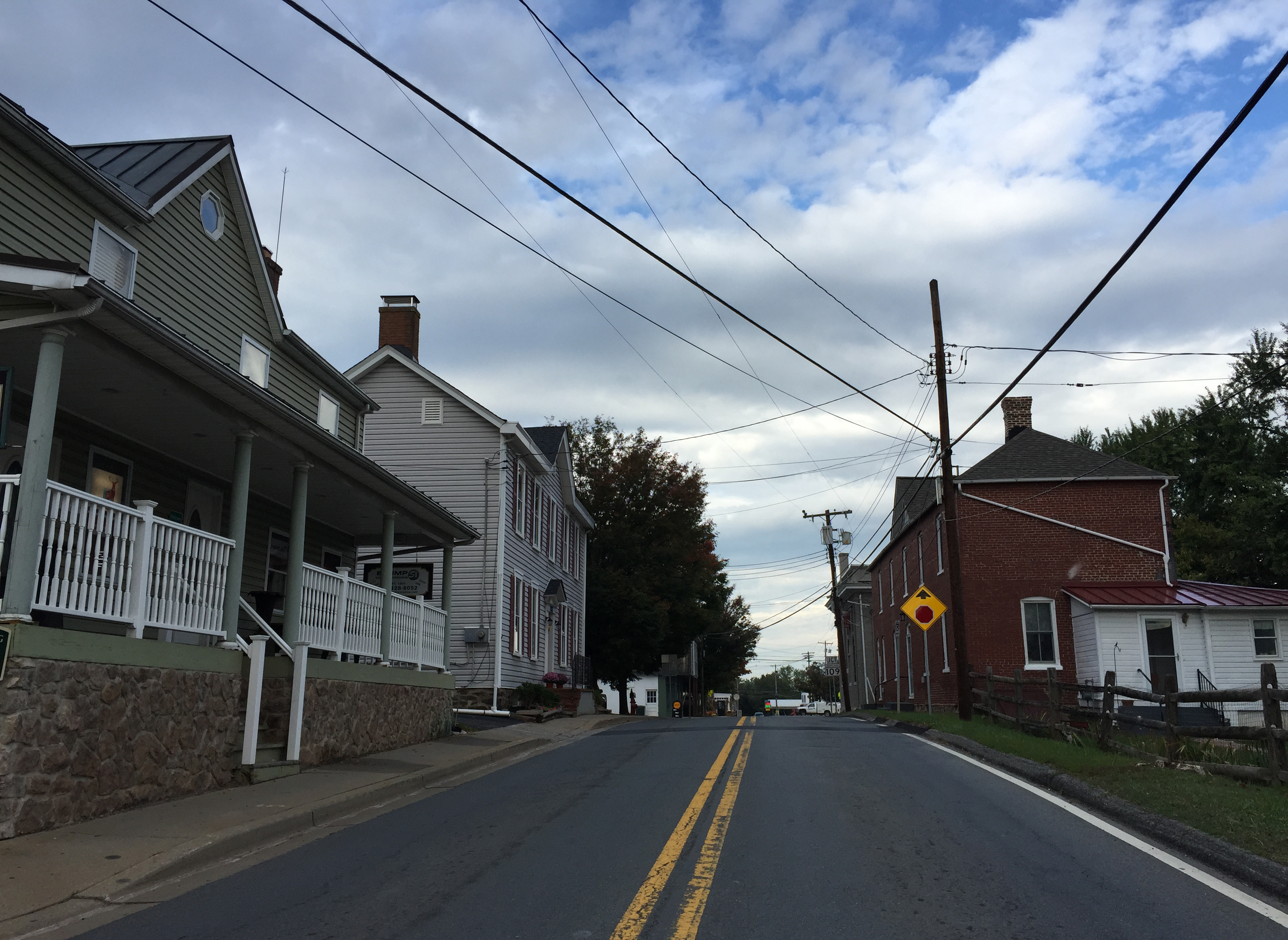
- View west along Maryland State Route 107 (Fisher Avenue) at Norris Road

- Flag Logo

- Location of Poolesville, Maryland
- Coordinates: 39°07′55″N 77°24′34″W
- Country: United States
- State: Maryland
- County: Montgomery
- Settled: 1760; 266 years ago
- Incorporated: 1867; 159 years ago

Government
  - Type: Board of Commissioners/Manager

Area
  - Total: 3.95 sq mi (10.23 km^{2})
  - Land: 3.93 sq mi (10.18 km^{2})
  - Water: 0.019 sq mi (0.05 km^{2})
- Elevation: 390 ft (120 m)

Population (2020)
  - Total: 5,742
  - Density: 1,460/sq mi (564/km^{2})
- Time zone: UTC-5 (EST)
  - Summer (DST): UTC-4 (EDT)
- ZIP code: 20837
- Area codes: 301, 240
- FIPS code: 24-62850
- GNIS feature ID: 2391366
- Website: poolesvillemd.gov

Poolesville is a U.S. town in the western portion of Montgomery County, Maryland. The population was 5,742 at the 2020 United States census. It is surrounded by, although not technically part of, the Montgomery County Agricultural Reserve, and is considered a distant bedroom community for commuters to Washington, D.C.

The name of the town comes from the brothers John Poole Sr. and Joseph Poole Sr. who owned land in what is now Poolesville. Due to a historical anomaly, until 2010 the legal name of the town was "The Commissioners of Poolesville". Residents overwhelmingly voted to formally change the name to "The Town of Poolesville" in the November 2010 general election.

== History ==
In 1760, brothers John Poole Sr. and Joseph Poole Sr. purchased 160 acres (0.65 km^{2}; 0.25 sq mi) in the area that is now Poolesville. Thirty-three years later, John Poole Jr. used a 15 acres (0.061 km^{2}) tract that he inherited from his father to build a log store and subdivided the tract, selling portions to a number of other merchants. The settlement grew from there and was incorporated in 1867.

During the Civil War, Union military leaders realized that the shallow fords of the Potomac River posed a threat to the capital city. At certain times of the year, the Potomac River is shallow enough to cross and thus thousands of troops were moved to both Darnestown and Poolesville. The Corps of Observation was established just outside Poolesville and soldiers were stationed near the river to monitor potential Confederate incursions into Maryland. During the winter of 1861–1862, it is estimated that 20,000 Union troops were stationed in or around the town. There were no battles fought in Poolesville; however, the infamous Battle of Ball's Bluff was fought nearby on October 21, 1861. Hundreds of Union soldiers who were stationed in Poolesville were killed in this battle that was badly managed by inexperienced Union generals.

There were several Confederate raids into the town during the war, and the Confederate Army invaded Maryland by crossing the Potomac near Poolesville in 1862 and 1864. The old Poolesville Methodist Church cemetery contains the remains of approximately twenty soldiers who either were killed in action at Ball's Bluff or who died of illness while in camp.

The Seneca Schoolhouse, a small one-room schoolhouse of red sandstone, was built in Poolesville in 1866 to educate the children of the stone cutters who worked at the Seneca Quarry. Operating as the Seneca Schoolhouse Museum, it provides tours to schoolchildren so that they can experience a typical school day as it would have been on March 13, 1880.

The Kunzang Palyul Choling Buddhist temple opened in Poolesville in 1985.

The Poolesville Historic District was listed in 1975 on the National Register of Historic Places.

In December 2020, White's Ferry, a ferry service west of the town across the Potomac River that a number of citizens have depended on for their livelihoods, ceased service due to a legal conflict between the ferry and Rockland Farm over ownership of land on the banks of the river. As of November 2026, the ferry has not yet reopened due to the legal conflict, though the owners have offered to donate the ferry to the Montgomery County government.

== Geography ==
According to the United States Census Bureau, the town has a total area of 3.95 square miles (10.23 km^{2}), of which 3.93 square miles (10.18 km^{2}) is land and 0.02 square miles (0.05 km^{2}) is water.

Poolesville lies off Montgomery County's main axis of suburban development along the Interstate 270 and Maryland State Route 355 corridor, separated from the contiguous Maryland suburbs of Washington by the rural lands of the county agricultural reserve, where new housing and commercial starts are restricted.

== Government ==
Poolesville is governed by five commissioners elected in staggered 4-year terms. Commissioners are not paid. The commissioners elect among themselves a president (known informally as "the mayor") and vice president. A Town Manager is responsible for the day-to-day operations of the town. Six Boards and Commissions assist the commissioners: the Planning Commission, Parks Board, Board of Elections, Sign Review Board, Board of Zoning Appeals, and Ethics Commission.

== Demographics ==
Historical population
Census	Pop.	Note	%±
1900	236		—
1910	174		−26.3%
1920	325		86.8%
1930	197		−39.4%
1940	204		3.6%
1950	161		−21.1%
1960	298		85.1%
1970	349		17.1%
1980	3,428		882.2%
1990	3,796		10.7%
2000	5,151		35.7%
2010	4,883		−5.2%
2020	5,742		17.6%
U.S. Decennial Census; 2010–2020

=== 2020 census ===
As of the 2020 census, Poolesville had a population of 5,742. The median age was 40.8 years. 27.3% of residents were under the age of 18 and 12.6% of residents were 65 years of age or older. For every 100 females there were 95.8 males, and for every 100 females age 18 and over there were 93.6 males age 18 and over.

98.2% of residents lived in urban areas, while 1.8% lived in rural areas.

There were 1,848 households in Poolesville, of which 46.3% had children under the age of 18 living in them. Of all households, 71.4% were married-couple households, 8.8% were households with a male householder and no spouse or partner present, and 17.0% were households with a female householder and no spouse or partner present. About 12.3% of all households were made up of individuals and 5.7% had someone living alone who was 65 years of age or older.

There were 1,901 housing units, of which 2.8% were vacant. The homeowner vacancy rate was 0.9% and the rental vacancy rate was 4.2%.

Racial composition as of the 2020 census
Race	Number	Percent
White	4,202	73.2%
Black or African American	299	5.2%
American Indian and Alaska Native	17	0.3%
Asian	402	7.0%
Native Hawaiian and Other Pacific Islander	0	0.0%
Some other race	182	3.2%
Two or more races	640	11.1%
Hispanic or Latino (of any race)	569	9.9%

=== 2010 census ===
As of the census of 2010, there were 4,883 people, 1,602 households, and 1,348 families residing in the town. The population density was 1,242.5 inhabitants per square mile (479.7/km^{2}). There were 1,663 housing units at an average density of 423.2 per square mile (163.4/km^{2}). The racial makeup of the town was 88.4% White, 5.2% African American, 0.5% Native American, 2.1% Asian, 1.4% from other races, and 2.5% from two or more races. Hispanic or Latino of any race were 7.0% of the population.

There were 1,602 households, of which 45.4% had children under the age of 18 living with them, 71.0% were married couples living together, 8.8% had a female householder with no husband present, 4.4% had a male householder with no wife present, and 15.9% were non-families. 12.2% of all households were made up of individuals, and 3% had someone living alone who was 65 years of age or older. The average household size was 3.04 and the average family size was 3.30.

The median age in the town was 41.5 years. 27.7% of residents were under the age of 18; 8.6% were between the ages of 18 and 24; 19.2% were from 25 to 44; 38.4% were from 45 to 64; and 6.1% were 65 years of age or older. The gender makeup of the town was 49.2% male and 50.8% female.

=== 2000 census ===
As of the census of 2000, there were 5,151 people, 1,601 households, and 1,402 families residing in the town. The population density was 1,333.8 inhabitants per square mile (515.0/km^{2}). There were 1,630 housing units at an average density of 422.1 per square mile (163.0/km^{2}). The racial makeup of the town in 2000 was 93.57% White, 2.85% African American, 0.49% Native American, 1.09% Asian, 1.4% from other races, and 1.28% from two or more races. Hispanic or Latino of any race were 2.68% of the population.

There were 1,601 households, out of which 56.8% had children under the age of 18 living with them, 75.6% were married couples living together, 9.0% had a female householder with no husband present, and 12.4% were non-families. 9.3% of all households were made up of individuals, and 2.0% had someone living alone who was 65 years of age or older. The average household size was 3.22 and the average family size was 3.44.

In the town, the population was spread out, with 35.0% under the age of 18, 5.6% from 18 to 24, 32.2% from 25 to 44, 24.0% from 45 to 64, and 3.2% who were 65 years of age or older. The median age was 35 years. For every 100 females, there were 96.5 males. For every 100 females age 18 and over, there were 94.2 males.

The median income for a household in the town was $85,092, and the median income for a family was $88,916. Males had a median income of $60,596 versus $42,051 for females. The per capita income for the town was $30,211. About 2.5% of families and 2.6% of the population were below the poverty line, including 3.0% of those under age 18 and 7.5% of those age 65 or over.

== Education ==
Poolesville is served by Montgomery County Public Schools. Three schools are located in Poolesville: Poolesville High School, John Poole Middle School, and Poolesville Elementary School. Monacacy Elementary School in Dickerson also feeds into John Poole MS.

== Transportation ==
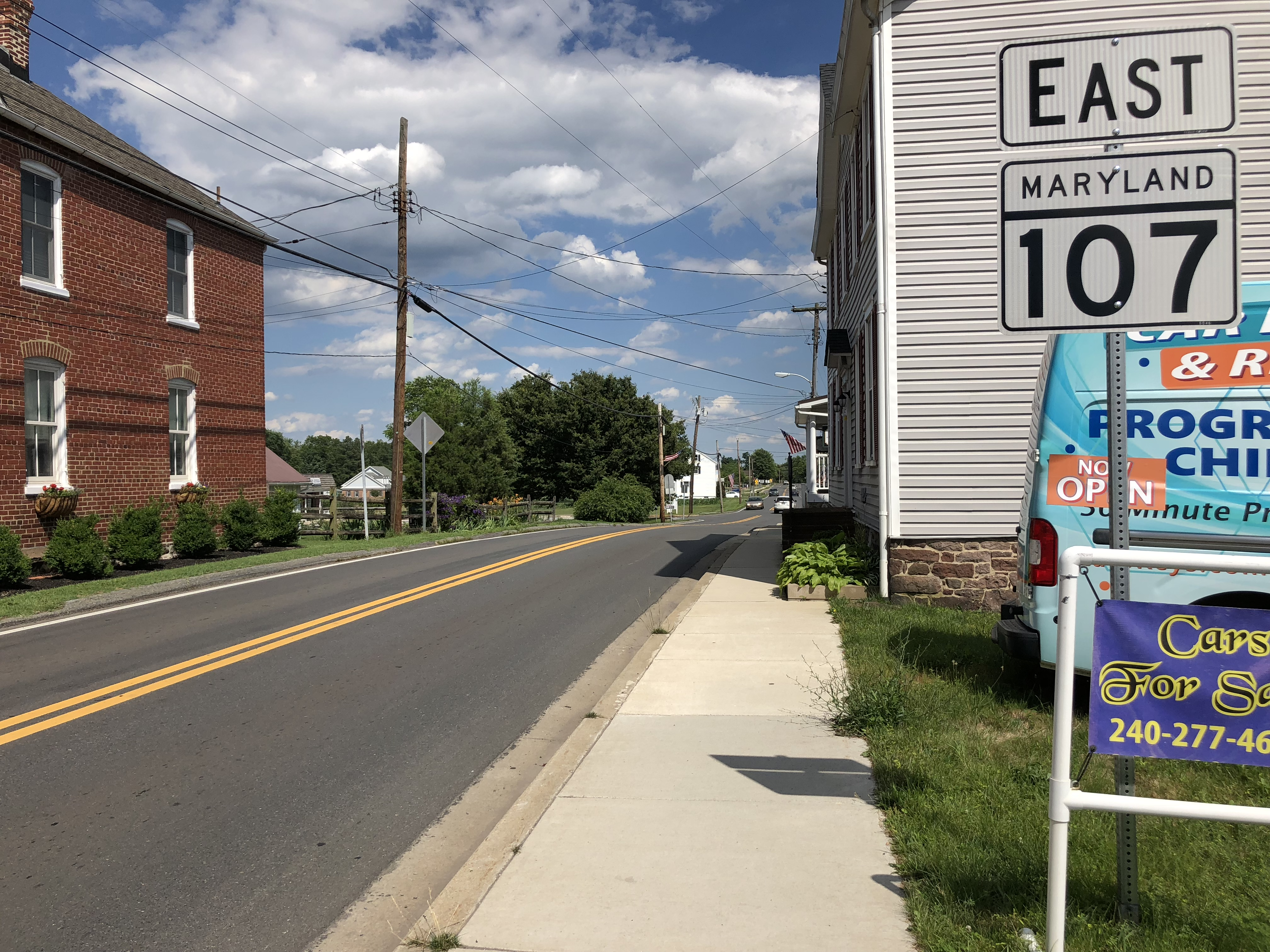
MD 107 eastbound in Poolesville

Two state highways serve Poolesville. Maryland Route 107 extends southeast from the center of town, joining Maryland Route 28 on its way to Rockville. Maryland Route 109 proceeds northeast from the center of town, intersecting MD 28 on its way to Interstate 270 in Hyattstown.

== Notable people ==
- Thomas Plater, (1769–1830) U.S. Congressman for Maryland's 3rd District, 1801–1805, died in Poolesville.
- Elijah V. White, (1832–1907) Confederate commander of the 35th Virginia Cavalry Battalion during the American Civil War. White was born in the area of Poolesville, and is the namesake of the nearby White's Ferry.
- Edward Pinkney Wroth, (1889–1946), third bishop of the Episcopal Diocese of Northwestern Pennsylvania, was the former Rector of St. Peter's Parish in Poolesville.
- Tony Lo Bianco, (1936–2024) Award-winning actor, known for, among other roles, playing Sal Boca in The French Connection (1971), owned a horse farm in Poolesville, where he spent his final years.
- Matthew Heimbach, notable far-right extremist and key figure in the 2017 white supremacist Unite the Right rally in Charlottesville, Virginia is from Poolesville.
- Ann Ritonia, Episcopal bishop and former Rector of St. Peter's Parish, now serving as Bishop Suffragan for Armed Services and Federal Ministries.
