= Maryland Route 97 =

State highway in Carroll, Howard, and Montgomery counties, Maryland, US

Maryland Route 97
- MD 97 in red, MD 97A in pink (south of Olney), former Brookeville alignment in gray

Route information
- Maintained by MDSHA
- Length: 55.27 mi (88.95 km)
- Existed: 1933–present
- Tourist routes: Mason and Dixon Scenic Byway

Major junctions
- South end: US 29 / MD 384 in Silver Spring
- MD 390 in Silver Spring; I-495 in Silver Spring; MD 28 in Norbeck; MD 200 Toll in Norbeck; I-70 / US 40 near Cooksville; MD 26 in Dorsey Crossroads; MD 32 in Fenby; MD 140 in Westminster; MD 27 in Westminster
- North end: PA 97 near Littlestown, PA

Location
- Country: United States
- State: Maryland
- Counties: Montgomery, Howard, Carroll

Highway system
- Maryland highway system; Interstate; US; State; Scenic Byways
← I-97	→ MD 99

Maryland Route 97 (MD 97) is a state highway in the U.S. state of Maryland. The route runs 55.27 mi (88.95 km) from U.S. Route 29 (US 29) in Silver Spring, Montgomery County, north to the Pennsylvania border in Carroll County, where the road continues into that state as Pennsylvania Route 97 (PA 97). Throughout most of Montgomery County, MD 97 is known as Georgia Avenue, which continues south from the southern terminus along US 29 into Washington, D.C. It is a suburban four- to six-lane divided highway from Silver Spring north to Olney. From here, the route continues as a rural two-lane undivided road north through Brookeville and into Howard County. MD 97 continues through Carroll County where it passes through the county seat of Westminster. The route intersects many major roads, including Interstate 495 (I-495, Capital Beltway) north of Silver Spring, MD 28 and MD 200 (Intercounty Connector) in Norbeck, I-70/US 40 near Cooksville, MD 26 in Dorsey Crossroads, and MD 27, MD 32, and MD 140 in the Westminster area.

With the creation of the U.S. Highway System in 1926, present-day MD 97 north of Westminster became a part of US 140. MD 97 was first designated by 1933 from MD 27/MD 410 (now US 29) in Silver Spring to north of US 40 in Cooksville. Two portions of the route between Cooksville and Westminster became MD 570 in 1939. In 1956, MD 97 was extended north from Cooksville to the Pennsylvania border northwest of Emmitsburg, Frederick County. It replaced the two sections of MD 570 along with the MD 32 designation between Westminster and the Pennsylvania border. MD 97 was rerouted to bypass Westminster in 1960 and was moved to a new alignment between Westminster and Taneytown in 1965; both former alignments became MD 32. In 1961, the route was realigned between MD 26 and MD 32, with the former segment becoming MD 854. MD 97 was rerouted to its current northern terminus in 1979, replacing that portion of US 140, while the former route between Westminster and northwest of Emmitsburg became part of MD 140.

== Route description ==
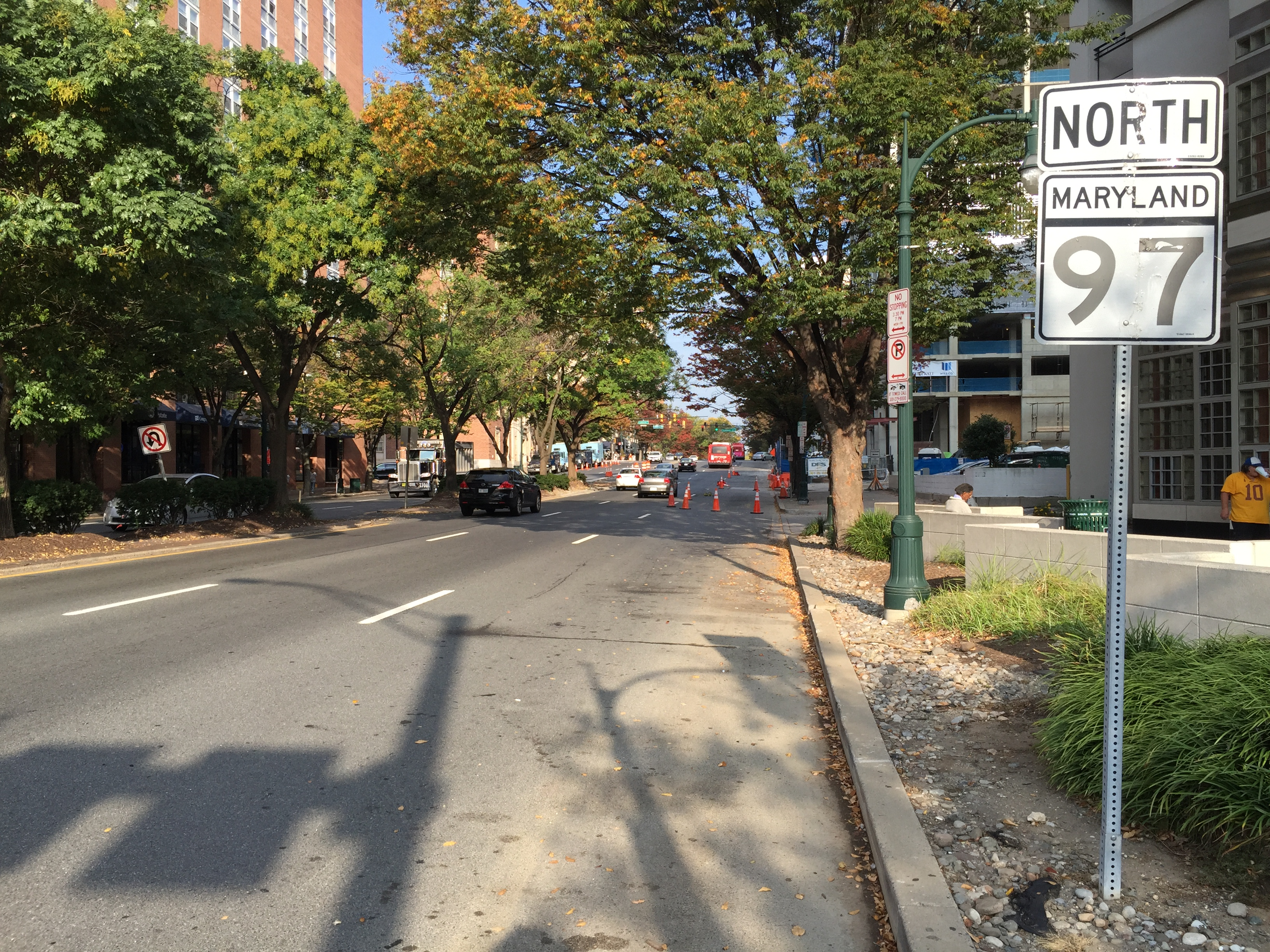
View north at the south end of MD 97 at US 29 in Silver Spring

MD 97 runs through the Washington, D.C. suburbs in Montgomery County, connecting several communities including Silver Spring, Wheaton, Glenmont, Norbeck, and Olney. It continues north from there into rural areas of Howard and Carroll counties, passing through the Carroll County seat of Westminster, before reaching the Pennsylvania border.

MD 97 has two stretches along which it is a part of the National Highway System. The highway is a principal arterial from its southern terminus in Silver Spring north to Brookeville Road in Brookeville. Within that section, MD 97 is an intermodal connector from I-495 north to MD 192 in Forest Glen. The highway is also a principal arterial from MD 32 at Fenby north to MD 140 in Westminster and from MD 140 in Westminster to a point south of MD 496 north of Westminster. MD 97 is a part of the main National Highway System along its concurrency with MD 140 in Westminster.

=== Montgomery County ===
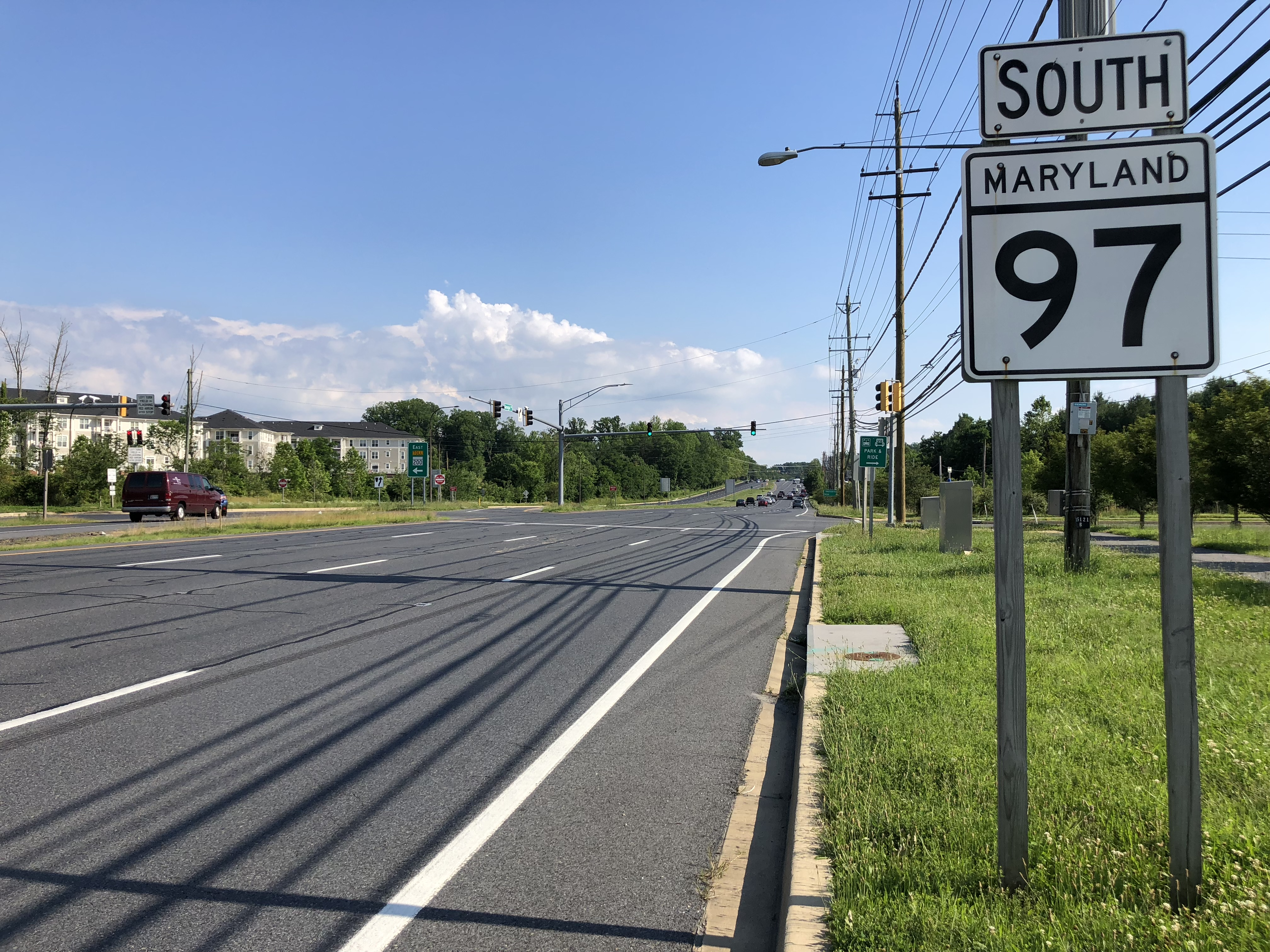
MD 97 southbound at the MD 200 interchange in Norbeck

MD 97 begins at an intersection with US 29 and MD 384 (Colesville Road) in downtown Silver Spring in Montgomery County, heading north on Georgia Avenue, a six-lane divided highway. From the route’s southern terminus, Georgia Avenue continues south as part of US 29 toward Washington, D.C. MD 97 passes commercial areas of high-rise buildings in Silver Spring before heading into residential neighborhoods. The route intersects the northern terminus of MD 390 (16th Street), which heads south and becomes 16th Street Northwest upon entering the District of Columbia. Washington Metro's Red Line begins to run below the route at this point. It continues north as a six-lane undivided road with reversible lanes through commercial areas before coming to a modified cloverleaf interchange with I-495 (Capital Beltway).

Past this interchange, the road becomes a divided highway again and intersects the eastern terminus of MD 192 (Forest Glen Road) near the Red Line's Forest Glen station. MD 97 passes more residences and continues toward Wheaton. The road heads into business areas again as it intersects MD 586 (Veirs Mill Road) east of the Westfield Wheaton shopping mall and adjacent to the Wheaton station along the Red Line. A short distance later, the road crosses MD 193 (University Boulevard) and continues back into residential areas past that intersection. The route heads into a mix of residential and commercial areas as it heads toward Glenmont, where it meets Randolph Road at a single-point urban interchange. A short distance later, MD 97 intersects the southern terminus of MD 182 (Layhill Road).

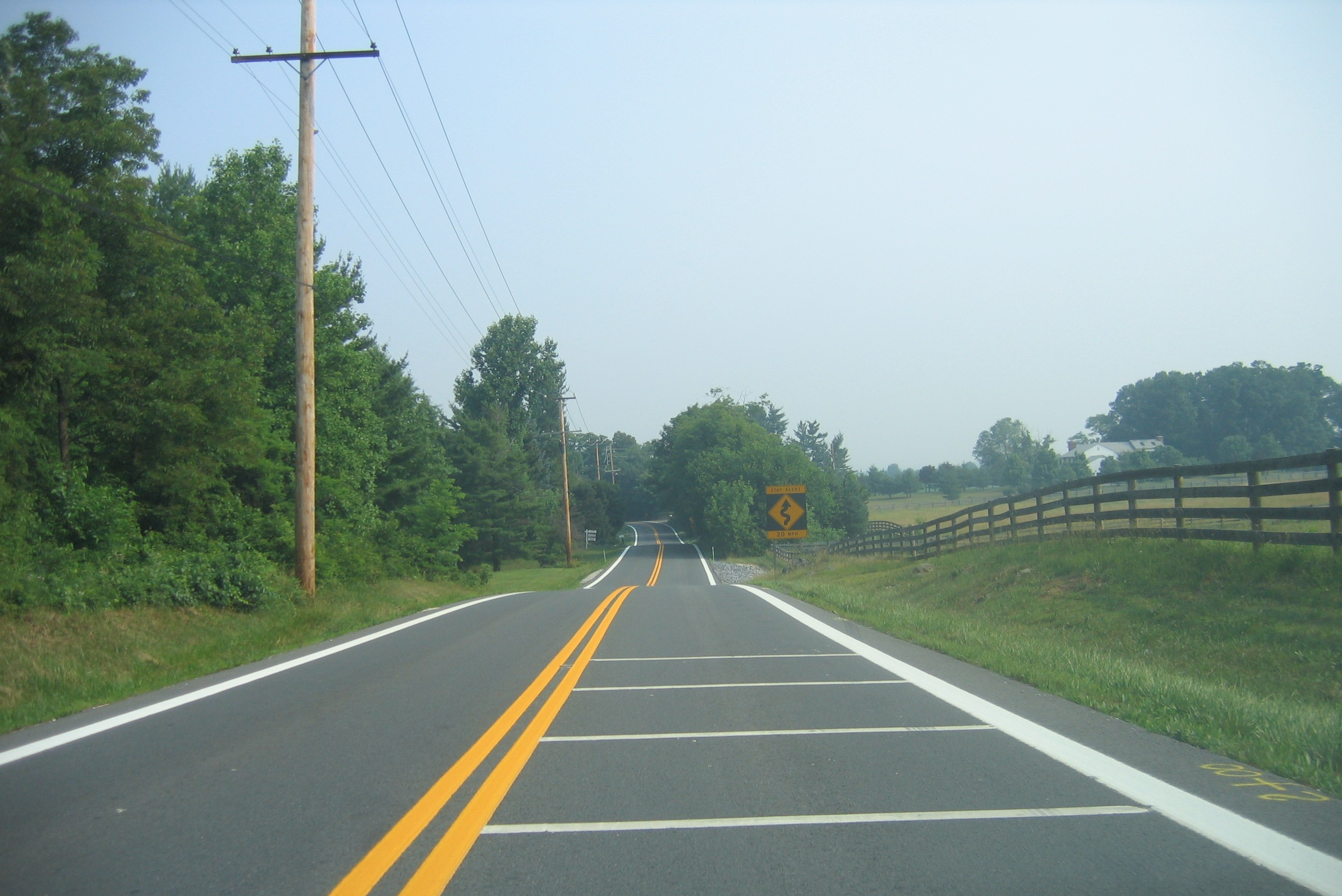
MD 97 northbound approaching Howard/Carroll county border

From here, MD 97 turns northwest and passes the Glenmont station terminus of Washington Metro's Red Line before it runs through residential neighborhoods, heading to the northeast of Matthew Henson State Park. Farther northwest, the route passes businesses near the intersection with the northern terminus of MD 185 (Connecticut Avenue) in Aspen Hill. It turns north again past this intersection and crosses Bel Pre Road. After crossing Bel Pre Road, the route heads into wooded neighborhoods before it passes through a mix of businesses and houses, with MD 655 running to the west of the road. MD 97 crosses MD 28 (Norbeck Road) in Norbeck, and continues past some residences where it intersects MD 655A, a short connector that provides access to westbound MD 28. MD 97 enters more wooded areas and narrows to four lanes, reaching a partial cloverleaf interchange with MD 200 (Intercounty Connector). A park and ride lot serving MTA Maryland commuter buses is located at the southwest corner of this interchange.

Past the MD 200 interchange, the ICC Trail runs parallel to the east side of the road. The route eventually passes parkland and residential areas as it crosses Emory Lane, where the ICC Trail splits to the west along that road. The road approaches Olney and passes by residential neighborhoods before heading into a business district at the intersection with MD 108 (Olney Sandy Spring Road). After this intersection, the road heads into wooded residential areas as a two-lane undivided road before reaching a roundabout with High Street, which leads into Brookeville. Bypassing Brookeville to the west, MD 97 reaches another roundabout west of Brookeville with Brookeville Road, which provides additional local access to the town. Continuing north past Brookeville, the road heads into a more rural setting, with areas of farms, woods, and some residences. MD 97 reaches Sunshine, where the road crosses MD 650 (New Hampshire Avenue/Damascus Road). Past Sunshine, MD 97 resumes through rural areas and enters woodland within Patuxent River State Park as it approaches the Patuxent River.

=== Howard and Carroll counties ===
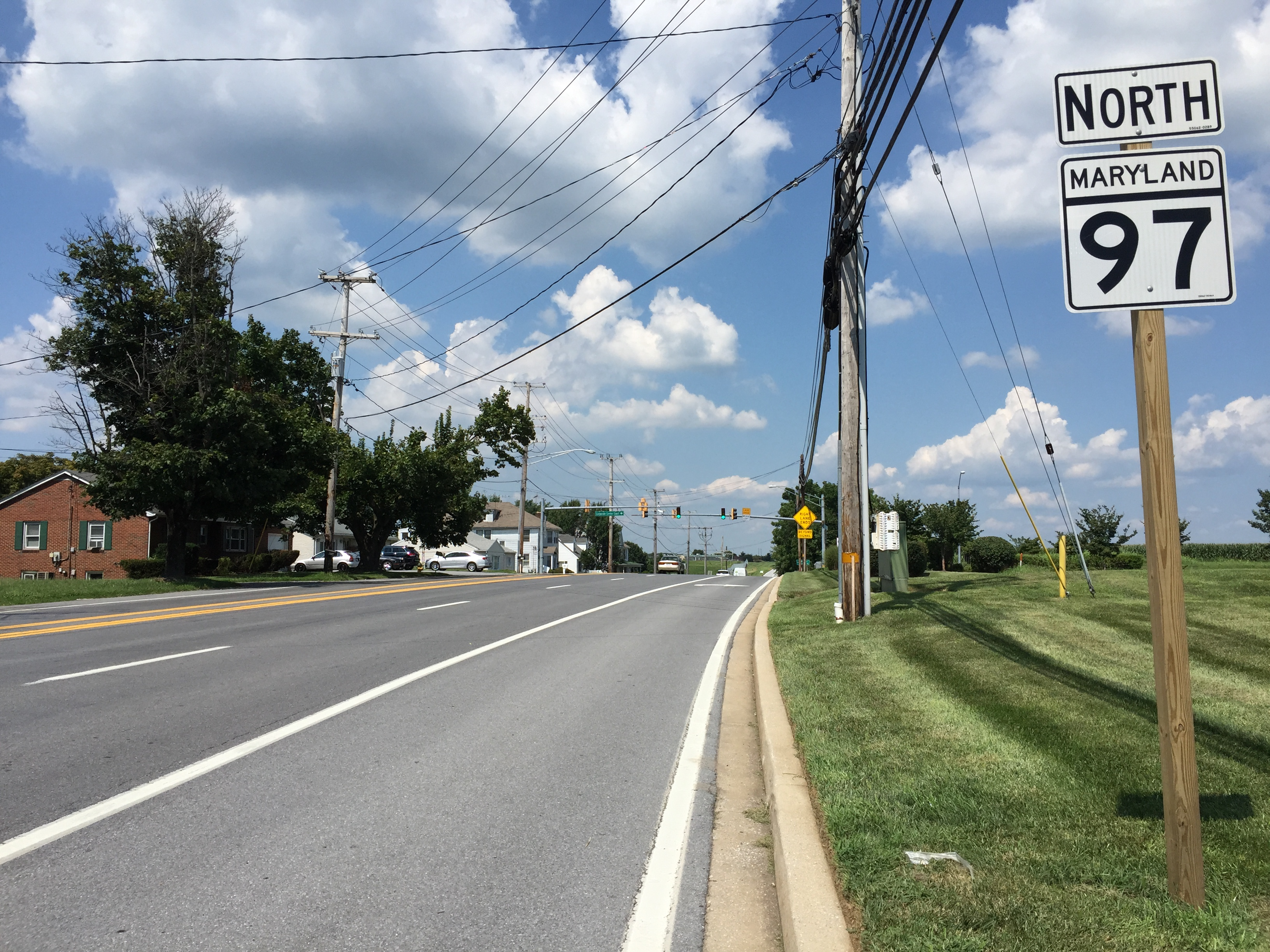
View north along MD 97 (Littlestown Pike) on the north side of Westminster

MD 97 crosses the Patuxent River into Howard County, where it becomes Roxbury Mills Road, named after the Roxbury Mill built in 1753. It continues north, passing areas of woods and farms along with suburban residential developments. The road heads through the community of Glenwood and continues through agricultural areas before intersecting MD 144 (Frederick Road) in the community of Cooksville. A park and ride lot is located at the northeast corner of this intersection. A short distance later, the route has a diamond interchange with I-70/US 40. Past this interchange, MD 97 becomes Hoods Mill Road and passes rural residential areas, intersecting Old Frederick Road. From here, the road winds through a mix of woods, farm fields, and residences before crossing the South Branch of the Patapsco River.

Upon crossing the river, MD 97 enters Carroll County and becomes Old Washington Road. The road crosses CSX's Old Main Line Subdivision railroad line as it passes wooded areas with some residences. It runs through a mix of woods and farms with some residences along the road. The number of residences increases as the route crosses Streaker Road in Berrett. From here, MD 97 passes more residences before intersecting MD 850 (Old Liberty Road) at a roundabout. A park and ride lot is located northwest of this roundabout. A short distance later, the route intersects MD 26 (Liberty Road) at a folded diamond interchange in Dorsey Crossroads. Past MD 26, MD 97 becomes New Washington Road and heads north through a mix of farmland, woodland, and residential neighborhoods, paralleled to the west by MD 854 (Old Washington Road). The road passes through woodland before intersecting Nicodemus Road, where it continues past farms and woods before heading west of a park and ride lot and crossing MD 32 (Sykesville Road) in Fenby.

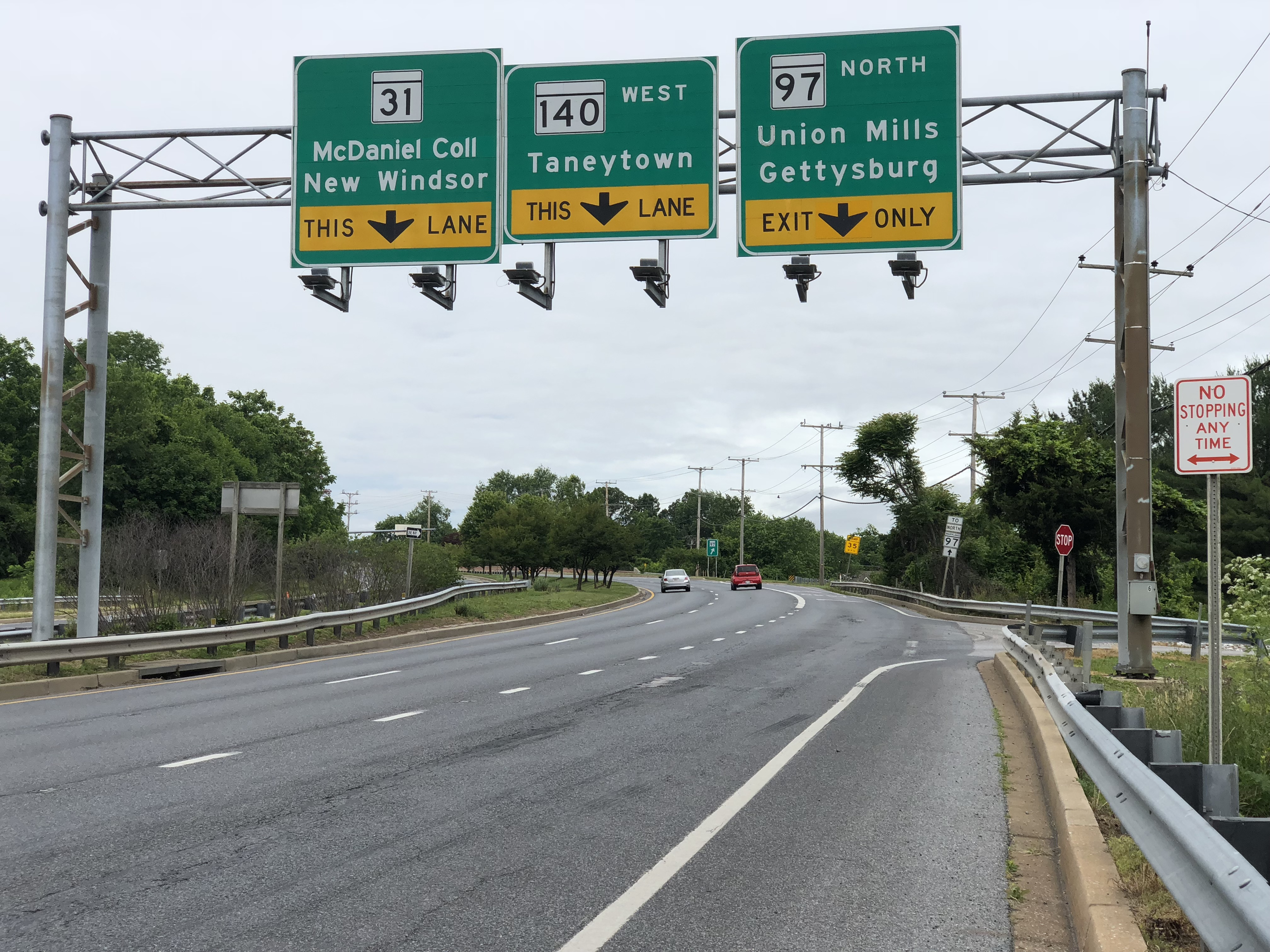
MD 97 northbound near its split with MD 140 westbound near Westminster

Past this intersection, MD 97 passes to the east of Carroll Community College and heads into residential areas as it approaches Westminster, bypassing the center of the town to the east. The route becomes Malcolm Drive past the intersection with Main Street/Old Westminster Road and continues to an intersection with MD 140 (Baltimore Boulevard). Here, MD 97 makes a left turn to form a concurrency with MD 140 on Baltimore Boulevard, a six-lane divided highway. The two routes head through commercial areas on the outskirts of Westminster, passing by the TownMall of Westminster before meeting MD 27 (Manchester Road) at a folded-diamond interchange. Past this interchange, the road passes over the Maryland Midland Railway and heads past more businesses. At the Sullivan Road intersection, the road becomes College View Boulevard and a short distance later, MD 97 splits from MD 140 at an interchange near McDaniel College.

MD 97 continues north on Littlestown Pike, a two-lane undivided road. The road passes east of the Carroll County Regional Airport before heading into a mix of farmland and residences. MD 97 intersects the western terminus of MD 496 (Bachmans Valley Road), and continues northwest through agricultural and wooded areas with intermittent residences. It passes through Union Mills, where the road intersects Old Hanover Road. MD 97 continues to the community of Silver Run, where it passes residences. Upon leaving this community, the route continues through woods and farm fields. A short distance later, MD 97 reaches the Pennsylvania border, where the road becomes PA 97 and continues north into Adams County.

== History ==
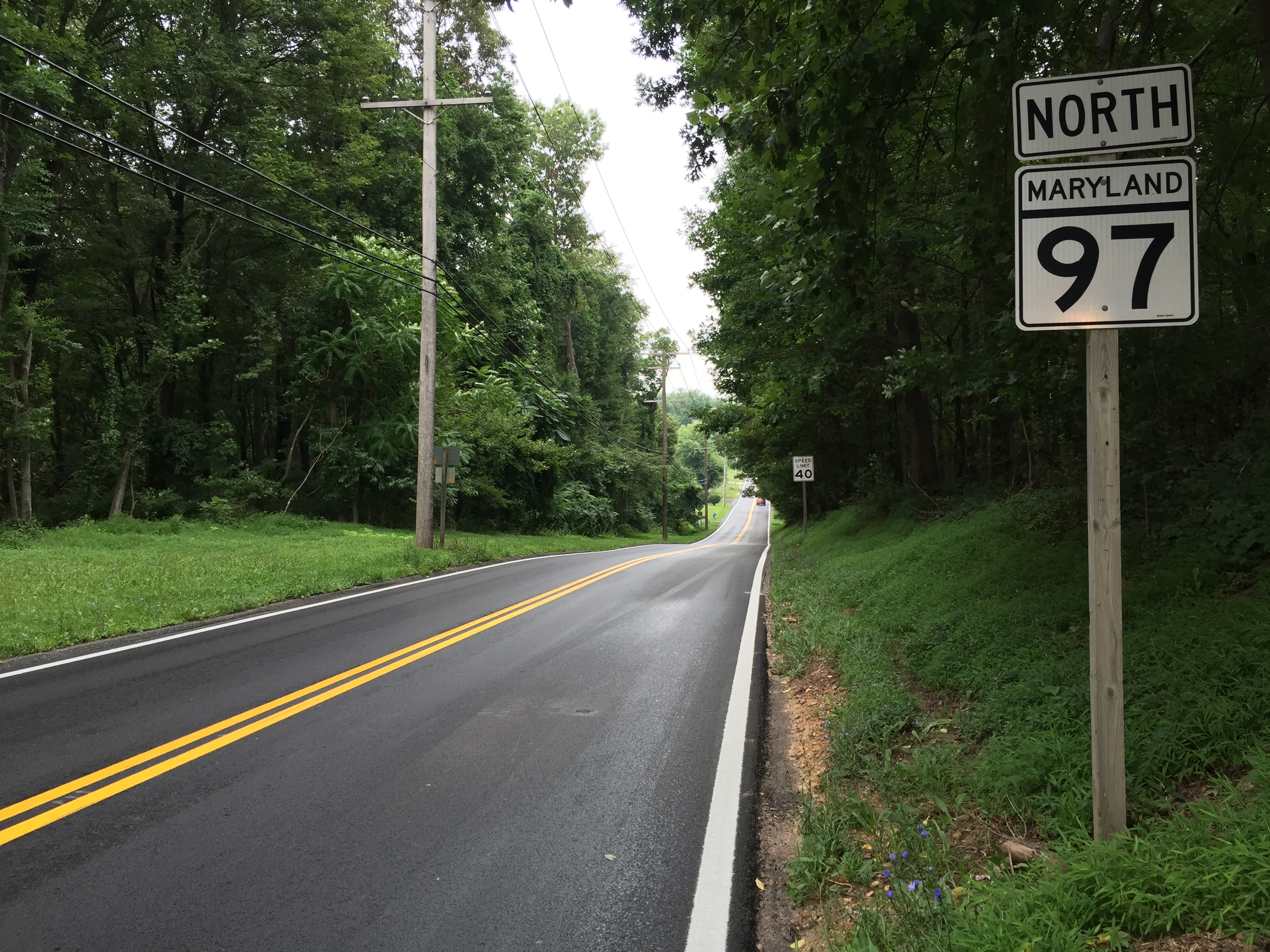
MD 97 northbound in Eldersburg

In 1911, Georgia Avenue was proposed as a state highway between the Washington, D.C. border and Brookeville. This section of state highway was completed by 1915. By 1921, a state highway was proposed between Roxbury Mills and Cooksville, with a small piece completed to the south of Cooksville. Also, a state highway was completed between Westminster and the Pennsylvania border, connecting to a road that continued northwest to Gettysburg, Pennsylvania. By 1923, the state road was finished between south of Cooksville and north of Roxbury Mills and to the north of Cooksville. With the creation of the U.S. Highway System on November 11, 1926, the portion of present-day MD 97 north of Westminster was designated as part of US 140, a U.S. Highway that ran from Baltimore to Gettysburg. In addition, the portion of Georgia Avenue between Norbeck and Olney was designated as part of MD 28 in 1927. The state highway was completed south to Roxbury Mills in 1928. By 1933, the state road between Brookeville and Roxbury Mills was finished.

MD 97 was designated by 1933 to run from MD 27/MD 410 (now US 29) in Silver Spring to north of US 40 (now MD 144) in Cooksville. In 1935, a state highway was finished south of the MD 26 intersection west of Eldersburg and heading south from MD 32 in Fenby. Both these highways were extended south about 0.5 miles (0.80 km) in 1938. In 1939, the state highway running south from MD 26 west of Eldersburg and from MD 32 south of Fenby were both designated as MD 570. By 1946, the MD 28 concurrency between Norbeck and Olney was removed. The southern section of MD 570 was extended south 0.5 miles (0.80 km) again in 1948. MD 97 was widened into a divided highway between Silver Spring and Glenmont in 1950.

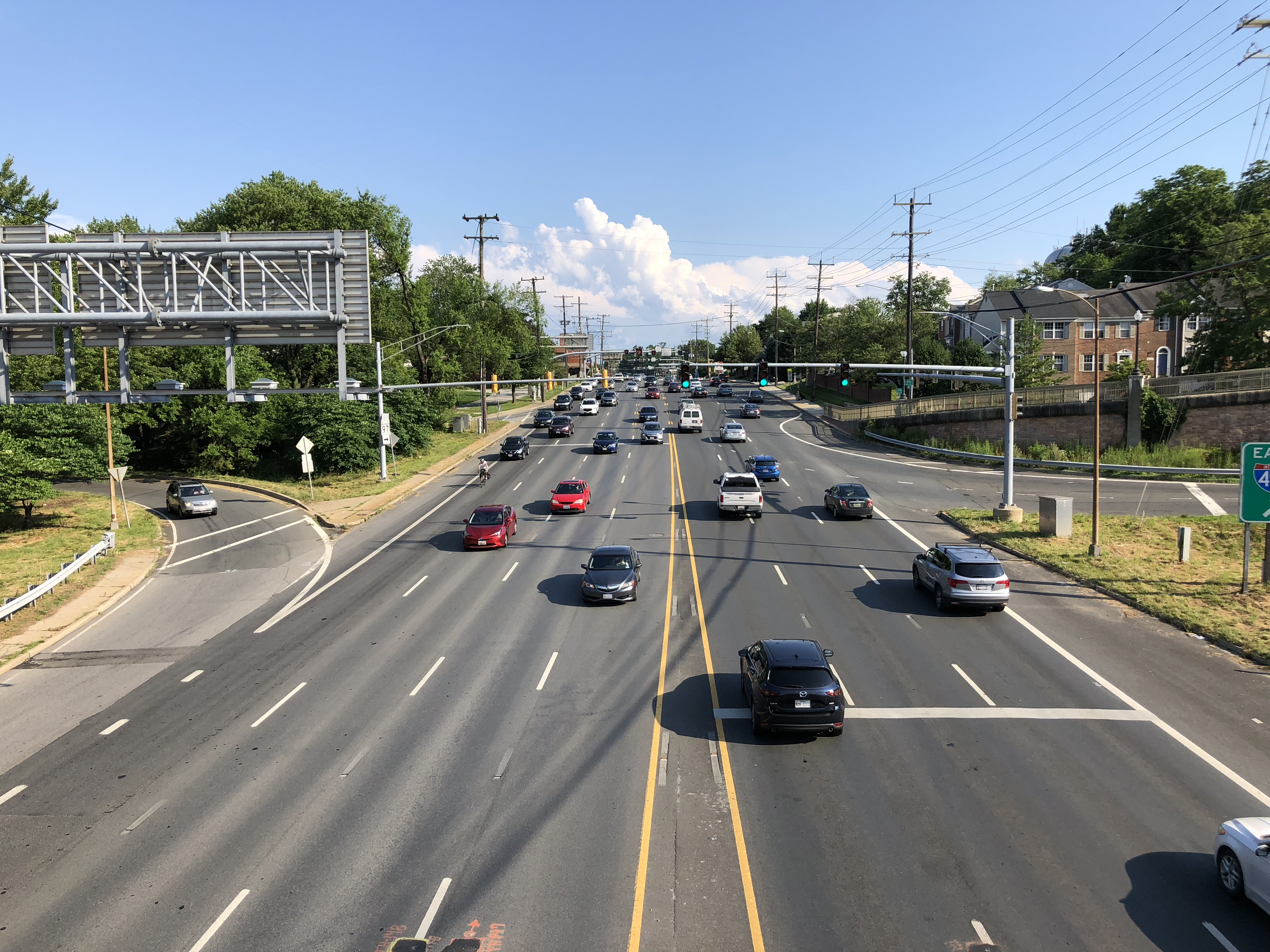
View south along MD 97 from I-495 in Silver Spring

In 1956, MD 97 was extended north to PA 16 at the Pennsylvania border northwest of Emmitsburg, Frederick County. The route ran north from Cooksville to Fenby, replacing both sections of MD 570, before it replaced MD 32 from Fenby north to Westminster and northwest through Taneytown and Emmitsburg. In 1960, MD 97 was moved to a new alignment that bypassed Westminster along newly constructed New Washington Road between Fenby and US 140 and the Westminster Bypass to the northwest side of the city. MD 32 was designated onto the former alignment of MD 97 that passed through Westminster on Washington Road and Main Street. In 1961, MD 97 was shifted to a new alignment to the east between MD 26 and MD 32; the former alignment became MD 854. The intersection with MD 26 was replaced with an interchange in 1962. In 1964, construction began on a new alignment of MD 97 slightly to the north between Westminster and Taneytown. This alignment was completed in 1965, and the former alignment became a part of MD 32 (now MD 832). In 1966, the divided highway portion of MD 97 was extended north from Glenmont to MD 28 in Norbeck.

In 1977, plans were made for US 140 to be decommissioned, with MD 97 to replace the section between Westminster and the Pennsylvania border, where it would connect to PA 97. This proposal was made in order to eliminate short routes from the U.S. Highway System. The American Association of State Highway and Transportation Officials approved the removal of the US 140 designation on October 28, 1977. On January 1, 1979, MD 97 was rerouted at Westminster to head north to the Pennsylvania border, replacing US 140. At the Pennsylvania border, the route connected to PA 97, which replaced the US 140 designation in Pennsylvania. Meanwhile, the former alignment of MD 97 between Westminster and the Pennsylvania border northwest of Emmitsburg became a part of MD 140. Dualization of MD 97 in Montgomery County was extended further north from MD 28 to MD 108 by 1989. An interchange was built with MD 200 (Intercounty Connector) north of MD 28, opening on February 23, 2011. An interchange was built at the route’s intersection with Randolph Road in order to improve movements for automobiles as well as for pedestrians and bicycles accessing the nearby Glenmont Metro station. Construction of the interchange at Randolph Road began in 2014 and was completed in 2018.

On September 25, 2018, a groundbreaking was held for a $47.6 million project to build a relocated MD 97 around Brookeville, with Governor Larry Hogan in attendance. The relocated MD 97 will be a two-lane road that will bypass the section through the center of Brookeville. The route was being realigned to improve safety and traffic flow, as the alignment of the route in Brookeville has a sharp turn and a steep hill. In 2022, the relocated MD 97 around Brookeville was expected to open in the middle part of 2023. The relocated MD 97 opened on May 21, 2023.

== Junction list ==
County	Location	mi	km	Destinations	Notes
Montgomery	Silver Spring	0.00	0.00	US 29 (Georgia Avenue / Colesville Road) / MD 384 south (Colesville Road) – Washington	Southern terminus of MD 97; eastern terminus of MD 384; no access from southbound MD 97 to northbound US 29 or from eastbound MD 384 to northbound MD 97
Montgomery	Silver Spring	0.91	1.46	MD 390 south (16th Street) – Washington	Northern terminus of MD 390; no direct access from northbound MD 97 to MD 390
Montgomery	Silver Spring	1.44	2.32	I-495 (Capital Beltway) to I-95 – Baltimore, Northern Virginia	Exits 31A-B on I-495
Montgomery	Silver Spring	1.61	2.59	MD 192 west (Forest Glen Road) – Kensington	Eastern terminus of MD 192
Montgomery	Wheaton	3.07	4.94	MD 586 west (Veirs Mill Road) – Rockville	No direct access from eastbound MD 586 to northbound MD 97; eastern terminus of MD 586
Montgomery	Wheaton	3.47	5.58	MD 193 (University Boulevard) – Kensington, Kemp Mill	No direct access from eastbound MD 193 to northbound MD 97 or from westbound MD 193 to southbound MD 97
Montgomery	Glenmont	4.64	7.47	Randolph Road	Interchange
Montgomery	Glenmont	4.81	7.74	MD 182 north (Layhill Road)	Southern terminus of MD 182
Montgomery	Aspen Hill	7.00	11.27	MD 185 south (Connecticut Avenue) / Connecticut Avenue north – North Kensington	Northern terminus of MD 185
Montgomery	Norbeck	8.82	14.19	MD 28 (Norbeck Road) to MD 115 – Rockville, Burtonsville	
Montgomery	Norbeck	9.43	15.18	MD 200 Toll (Intercounty Connector) to I-95 / I-270	Exits 8A-B on MD 200; E-ZPass or Video Tolling
Montgomery	Olney	11.89	19.14	MD 108 (Olney Sandy Spring Road) – Laytonsville, Ashton	
Montgomery		17.02	27.39	MD 650 (New Hampshire Avenue / Damascus Road) – Damascus, Ashton	
Howard	Cooksville	24.58	39.56	MD 144 (Frederick Road) – Lisbon, West Friendship	Former US 40
Howard	Cooksville	25.03	40.28	I-70 / US 40 – Baltimore, Frederick	Exit 76 on I-70 / US 40
Carroll		32.48	52.27	MD 850 (Old Liberty Road)	Roundabout; former MD 26
Carroll	Eldersburg	32.67	52.58	MD 26 (Liberty Road) – Libertytown, Eldersburg	Interchange
Carroll	Fenby	39.39	63.39	MD 32 (Sykesville Road) – Gamber	
Carroll	Westminster	42.57	68.51	MD 140 east (Baltimore Boulevard) – Baltimore	Southern terminus of concurrency with MD 140
Carroll	Westminster	43.93	70.70	MD 27 (Manchester Road) – Downtown Westminster, Manchester, Hampstead	Interchange
Carroll	Westminster	44.89	72.24	MD 140 west (College View Boulevard) – Taneytown	Interchange; northern terminus of concurrency with MD 140
Carroll		47.29	76.11	MD 496 east (Bachmans Valley Road) – Melrose	Western terminus of MD 496
Carroll		55.27	88.95	PA 97 north (Baltimore Pike) – Littlestown, Gettysburg	Pennsylvania state line; northern terminus of MD 97
1.000 mi = 1.609 km; 1.000 km = 0.621 mi: Concurrency terminus; Electronic toll collection; Incomplete access

== Auxiliary route ==
- MD 97A runs along an old section of MD 97 that parallels the route to the west, running from a cul-de-sac north to an intersection with MD 97 at Emory Church Road in Olney, Montgomery County. The route is 0.32 mi (0.51 km) long.
