= Maryland Route 586 =

Highway in Montgomery County, Maryland, United States

Maryland Route 586
- Veirs Mill Road
- Maryland Route 586 highlighted in red

Route information
- Maintained by MDSHA
- Length: 5.78 mi (9.30 km)
- Existed: 1935–present

Major junctions
- West end: MD 28 / MD 911 in Rockville
- MD 185 in Wheaton; MD 193 in Wheaton
- East end: MD 97 in Wheaton

Location
- Country: United States
- State: Maryland
- Counties: Montgomery

Highway system
- Maryland highway system; Interstate; US; State; Scenic Byways
← MD 584	→ MD 587

Maryland Route 586 (MD 586) is a state highway in the U.S. state of Maryland. Known as Veirs Mill Road, the highway runs 5.78 miles (9.30 km) from MD 28 and MD 911 in Rockville east to MD 97 in Wheaton. MD 586 is a four- to six-lane northwest–southeast highway through southern Montgomery County. The highway was originally constructed in the mid-1930s. MD 586 was expanded to a divided highway in the mid-1950s.

== Route description ==
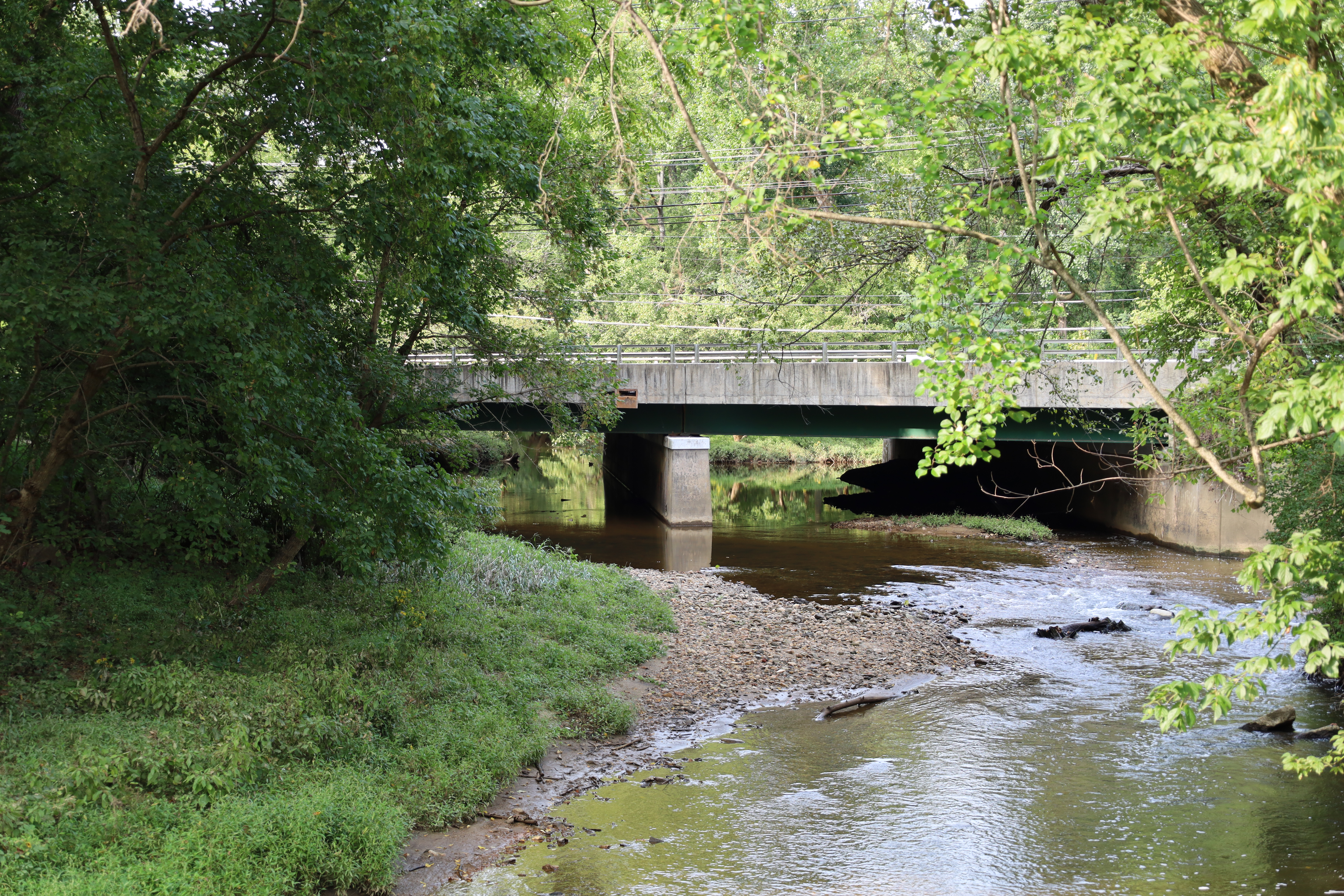
Rock Creek crossing

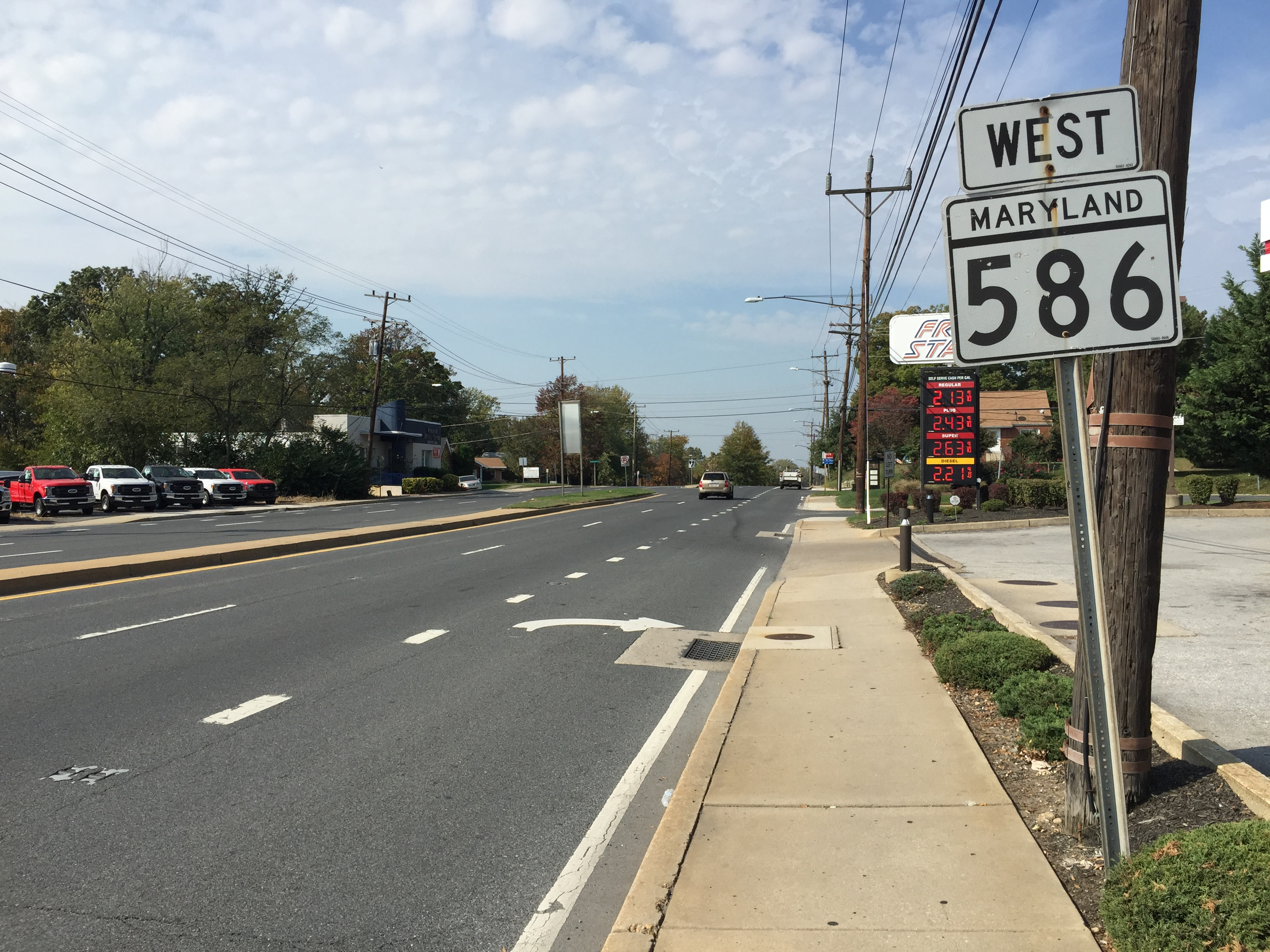
View west along MD 586 at MD 193 in Wheaton

MD 586 begins at the intersection of Veirs Mill Road and First Street in Rockville. MD 28 heads west along Veirs Mill Road across CSX's Metropolitan Subdivision railroad line toward downtown Rockville; the highway also heads north along First Street toward Norbeck. MD 911 heads south along First Street under the railroad toward North Bethesda. Access from MD 586 to northbound and southbound MD 355 (Rockville Pike) on the west side of the railroad tracks is via MD 28 and MD 911, respectively. MD 586 heads east as a four-lane divided highway through the eastern part of the city of Rockville. The highway is paralleled by service roads east to Twinbrook Parkway, east of which the highway leaves the city limits and crosses Rock Creek. Between the creek and Aspen Hill Road, MD 586 is crossed by a sweeping pedestrian bridge that carries the Rock Creek Hiker-Biker Trail.

MD 586 parallels Rock Creek southeast along the southern edge of Aspen Hill. After crossing Turkey Branch where the route intersects the linear Matthew Henson State Park, the highway leaves the valley of Rock Creek and expands to six lanes ahead of its intersection with Randolph Road. Local streets are used to circumvent the lack of direct access from eastbound Randolph Road to westbound MD 586 and from westbound Randolph Road to eastbound MD 586. East of Randolph Road, the two directions of the highway change from two to three lanes and back intermittently. MD 586 continues southeast and intersects MD 185 (Connecticut Avenue) just west of its crossing of an unnamed branch of Rock Creek. The highway enters the town center of Wheaton shortly before its intersection with MD 193 (University Boulevard). MD 586 passes between the Westfield Wheaton shopping mall and the Wheaton station on the Washington Metro's Red Line before reaching its eastern terminus at MD 97 (Georgia Avenue). There is no direct access from MD 586 to northbound MD 97.

MD 586 is a part of the National Highway System as a principal arterial for its entire length.

== History ==
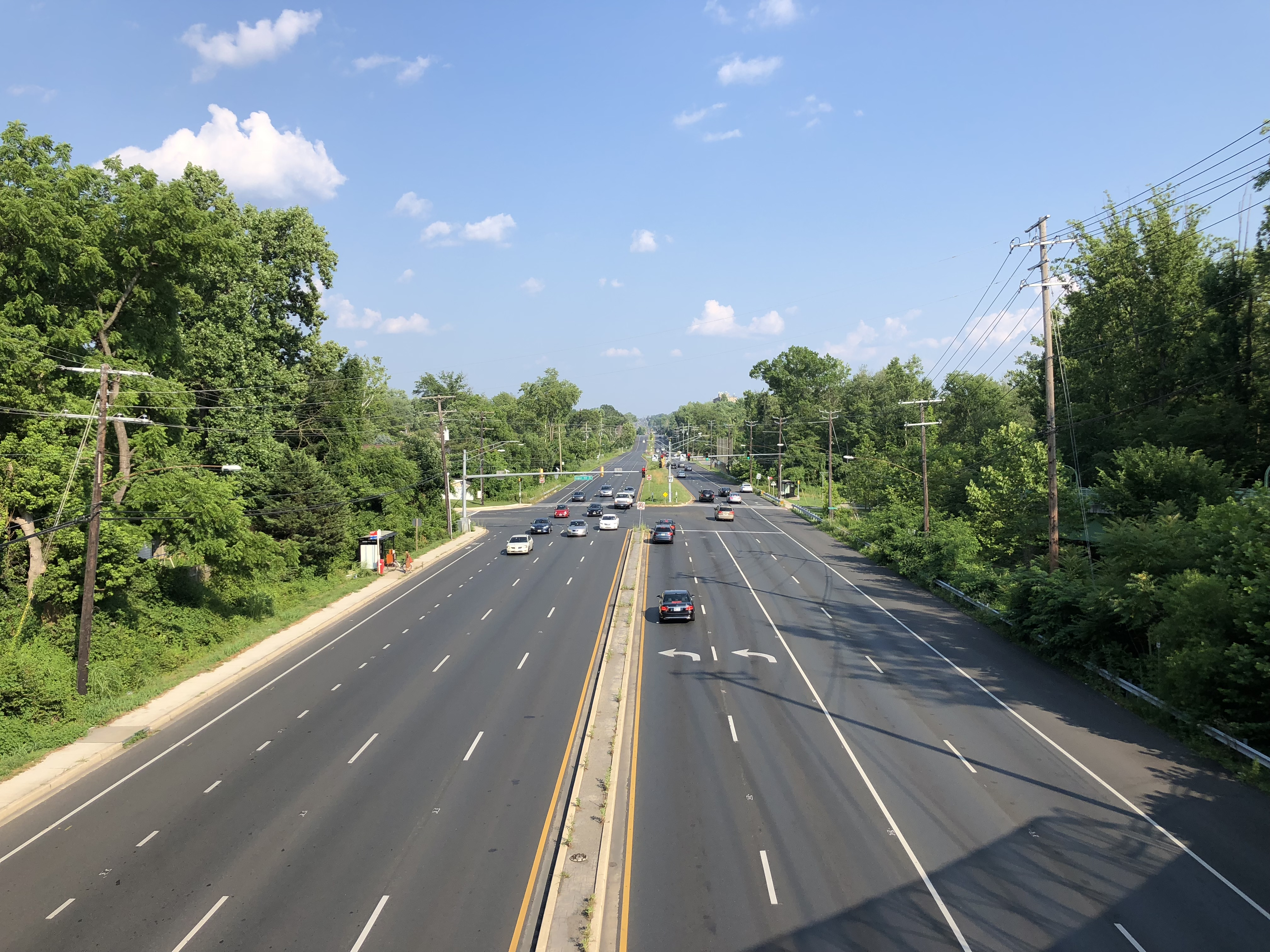
View east along MD 586 from the overpass for the Rock Creek Trail

Veirs Mill Road is named for a grist and sawmill on Rock Creek built by Samuel Clark Veirs in 1838 and operated by his family until 1924. This mill drew business from Rockville and Mitchell's Crossroads, which later became Wheaton, along its namesake road. MD 586 was constructed starting in 1934. By the end of 1935, the highway was paved as a macadam road from MD 97 northwest to a branch of Rock Creek next to the modern MD 586–MD 185 intersection. Two segments of concrete road were also completed from the end of the macadam segment northwest to Turkey Branch and from First Street Rockville southeast to Edmonston Drive in Rockville. The remainder of the highway was completed in 1937 concurrent with Veirs Mill Road's original bridge across the Baltimore and Ohio Railroad (now CSX) between First Street and U.S. Route 240 (now MD 355). MD 28 was relocated east on Veirs Mill Road across the new bridge, then north on First Street when the project was complete.

Expansion of MD 586 to a four-lane divided highway began in 1954. The first segment of the expanded highway, from just east of MD 28 in Rockville to Turkey Branch, was started that year and completed in 1956. This work included widening and reconstructing the route's bridge across Rock Creek. MD 586 was expanded to a divided highway from Turkey Branch to MD 97 between 1955 and 1957. The westernmost segment of the highway at the MD 28 intersection was expanded to a divided highway shortly after the completion of MD 28's modern bridge across the railroad in 1981. The pedestrian bridge that carries the Rock Creek Hiker-Biker Trail across MD 586 was constructed starting in 2008 and opened in 2011.

== Junction list ==
The entire route is in Montgomery County.

Location	mi	km	Destinations	Notes
Rockville	0.00	0.00	MD 28 (Veirs Mill Road) / MD 911 south (First Street) to MD 355 – Norbeck, North Bethesda, Gaithersburg	Western terminus; northern terminus of MD 911
Wheaton	3.48	5.60	Randolph Road – North Bethesda, Glenmont	No direct access from eastbound Randolph Road to westbound MD 586 or from westbound Randolph Road to eastbound MD 586
Wheaton	4.01	6.45	MD 185 (Connecticut Avenue) – Kensington, Aspen Hill	
Wheaton	5.36	8.63	MD 193 (University Boulevard) to MD 97 north – Kensington, Silver Spring	
Wheaton	5.78	9.30	MD 97 south (Georgia Avenue) – Silver Spring	Eastern terminus; no direct access from eastbound MD 586 to northbound MD 97
1.000 mi = 1.609 km; 1.000 km = 0.621 mi: Incomplete access
