= Maryland Route 185 =

State highway in Maryland, United States

Maryland Route 185
- Connecticut Avenue
- Maryland Route 185 highlighted in red

Route information
- Maintained by MDSHA
- Length: 8.30 mi (13.36 km)

Major junctions
- South end: Chevy Chase Circle in Chevy Chase Village
- MD 410 in Chevy Chase; I-495 in Chevy Chase; MD 547 in Kensington; MD 192 in Kensington; MD 193 in Kensington; MD 586 in Wheaton
- North end: MD 97 in Aspen Hill

Location
- Country: United States
- State: Maryland
- County: Montgomery

Highway system
- Maryland highway system; Interstate; US; State; Scenic Byways
← MD 182	→ MD 186

Maryland Route 185 (MD 185) is a state highway in the U.S. state of Maryland. Known as Connecticut Avenue, the state highway runs 8.30 mi (13.36 km) from Chevy Chase Circle at the Washington, D.C., border north to MD 97 in Aspen Hill. MD 185 serves as a major north-south commuter route in southern Montgomery County, connecting the District of Columbia with the residential suburbs of Chevy Chase, Kensington, and Wheaton.

MD 185's history can be divided into two segments. The portion south of Kensington was included in the state highway system by 1927 as an extension of Connecticut Avenue out of the District of Columbia and was the westernmost stretch of MD 193. The Chevy Chase to Kensington stretch was expanded to a divided highway in the 1950s. The segment of MD 185 between Kensington and Aspen Hill was built as a divided highway on a new alignment in the 1960s and designated MD 185. The MD 185 designation was extended south of Kensington, replacing MD 193, in the 1970s. Construction projects in the 1980s and early 1990s completed MD 185 as a six-lane highway.

== Route description ==
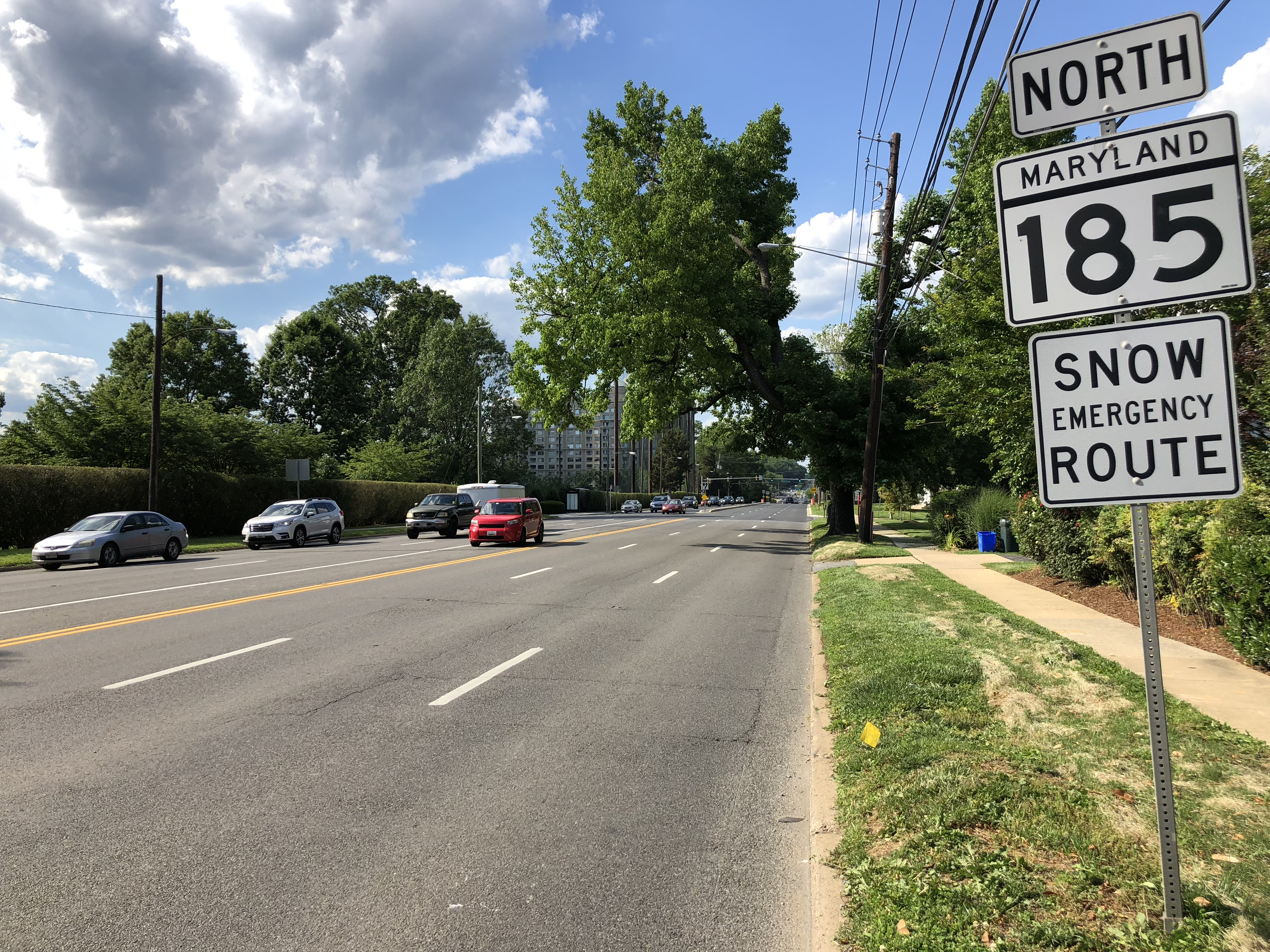
MD 185 northbound at MD 410 in Chevy Chase

MD 185 begins at Chevy Chase Circle on the border of the District of Columbia. Connecticut Avenue continues south into the Chevy Chase neighborhood of Washington, D.C., on the south side of the circle, while Western Avenue intersects the east and west sides of the circle. MD 185 heads north as a six-lane divided highway through an affluent residential area in Chevy Chase Village. After passing the Chevy Chase Club to the west, the state highway intersects MD 191 (Bradley Lane) and enters the Town of Chevy Chase. MD 185 continues due north, passing the former headquarters of 4-H and intersecting MD 410 (East–West Highway). After crossing MD 410, the state highway passes Columbia Country Club. MD 185 enters a commercial area where it run under bridges carrying the future Purple Line and the new alignment of the Capital Crescent Trail. It intersects Manor Road, which fills the missing movements at the subsequent five-way intersection with Jones Bridge Road and Kensington Parkway, where left turns are prohibited from both directions of MD 185 and westbound Jones Bridge Road.

After crossing Jones Bridge Road, MD 185 continues north through residential areas and intersects Interstate 495 (Capital Beltway) at a partial cloverleaf interchange. Immediately after the interchange, the state highway crosses Rock Creek and intersects Beach Drive within Rock Creek Park. MD 185 leaves the valley of Rock Creek and enters the town of Chevy Chase View. Upon entering Kensington and the Kensington Historic District, the state highway veers to the northwest and back to the north ahead of the intersection with MD 547 (Knowles Avenue), where the highway enters a commercial area. After crossing CSX's Metropolitan Subdivision railroad line and MARC's Brunswick Line on an overpass, MD 185 crosses MD 192 (Plyers Mill Road). As the road turns northeast, the state highway meets MD 193 (University Boulevard). While MD 193 continues northeast toward Wheaton, MD 185 veers left to continue due north. The next intersection, Perry Avenue, is used to complete the movements between MD 185 north and MD 193 east.

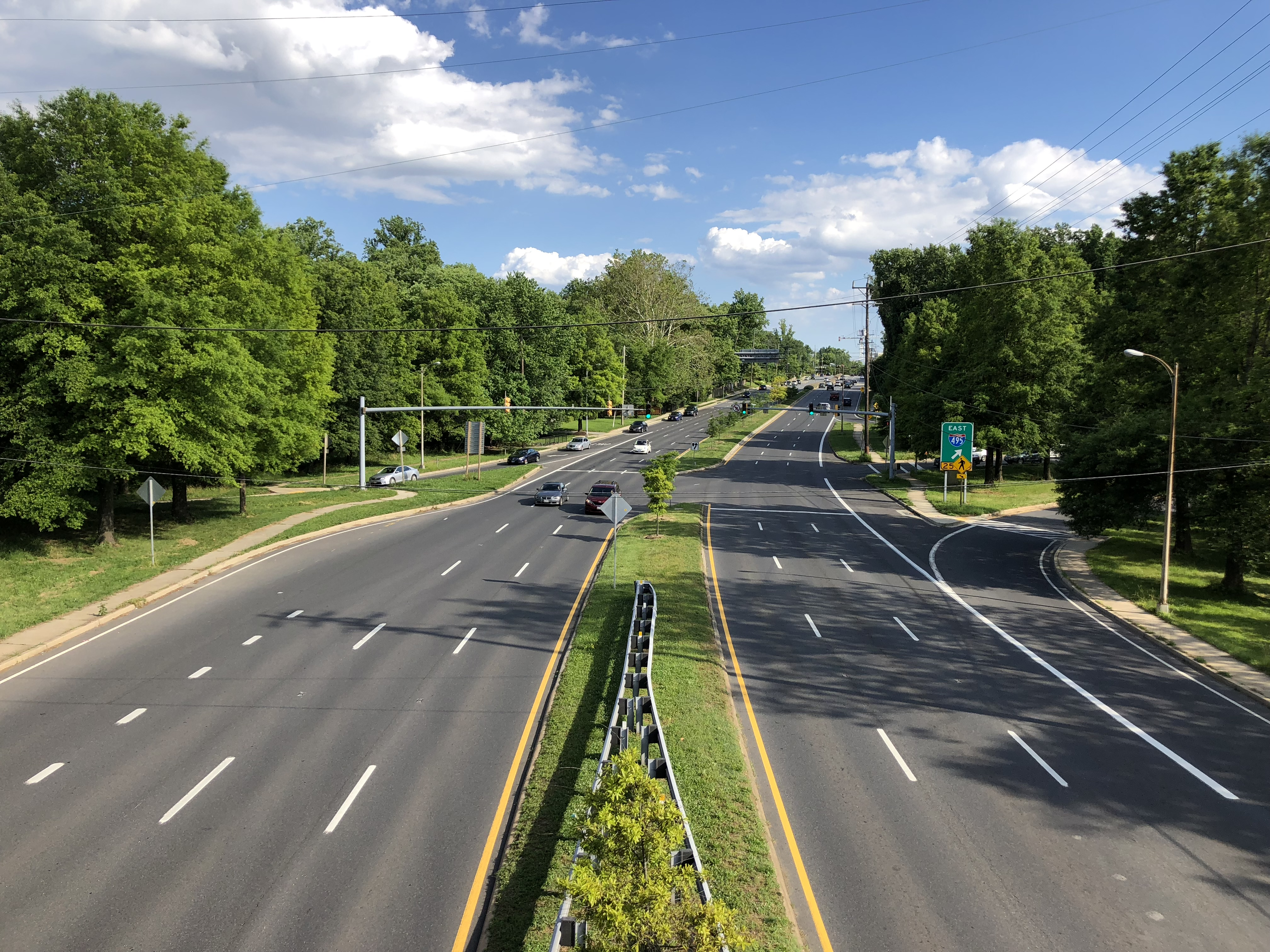
View south along MD 185 from I-495 in Chevy Chase

After leaving the town limits of Kensington, MD 185 becomes a six-lane divided highway with partial control of access, passing between residential subdivisions. After crossing a tributary of Rock Creek, the state highway intersects MD 586 at an acute intersection. MD 185 then becomes lined with service roads ahead of and after the intersection with Randolph Road. Beyond Weller Road, the state highway crosses Turkey Branch and then a bridge over Matthew Henson State Park. MD 185 then enters Aspen Hill and intersects Aspen Hill Road within a commercial area. The state highway meets its northern terminus at MD 97 (Georgia Avenue). Connecticut Avenue continues as a county-maintained highway north across Bel Pre Road into Rossmoor, home of the Leisure World retirement community.

MD 185 is a part of the National Highway System as a principal arterial for its entire length.

== History ==
The roadway that would become MD 185 was initially laid down in 1890 as an extension of Connecticut Avenue NW in Washington, D.C., by the Chevy Chase Land Company, a developer that had bought up some 1,700 acres in southern Montgomery County and Northwest D.C. with plans to create a streetcar suburb. As part of their plan to create the neighborhoods of Chevy Chase, the company bridged Rock Creek, graded the road, and laid a streetcar line from today's Woodley Park neighborhood in D.C. to Jones Bridge Road.

MD 185 itself was constructed and designated in two segments. The first section to be built was between Chevy Chase and Kensington as an extension of Connecticut Avenue into Montgomery County, which was designated MD 193. The section between Bradley Lane and Kensington was paved by 1927. The segment south of Bradley Lane was paved as a county road by 1930. By 1936, the segment of Connecticut Avenue south of Bradley Lane had come under state control. The grade crossing of the railroad tracks in Kensington was eliminated by the construction of a bypass and bridge in 1936 as well. In December 1937, State Roads Commission chairman Homer Tabler "announced" that the state highway system had added Connecticut Avenue from the District line to Chevy Chase Lake, along with Bradley Lane between Connecticut and Wisconsin Avenue.

The section of MD 193 south of MD 410 was marked as US 240 Alternate by 1946, a designation it retained until the 1960s. The segment from the D.C. line to north of MD 410 in Chevy Chase was expanded to a multi-lane divided highway in 1950. The remainder of the route to Kensington was expanded to a divided highway between 1957 and 1960.

The section of highway between Kensington and Aspen Hill was built on a new alignment as a four-lane divided highway in stages in the 1960s and given the designation of MD 185. The highway was completed from Kensington to MD 586 in 1963. The remaining section north to Aspen Hill was completed in 1969. Immediately north of the crossing of Turkey Branch is a bridge that was to be MD 185's overpass of the Washington Outer Beltway. Ramp stubs exist next to the bridge for the partial cloverleaf interchange with this cancelled freeway. By 1980, the MD 185 designation was extended south from Kensington south to the D.C. line. The state highway was expanded to six lanes to Beach Drive in 1986 and through Kensington in 1991.

== Junction list ==
The entire route is in Montgomery County.

Location	mi	km	Destinations	Notes
Chevy Chase Village	0.00	0.00	Chevy Chase Circle (MD 185E)	Southern terminus; MD 185E unsigned
Chevy Chase Village	0.60	0.97	MD 191 west (Bradley Lane)	Eastern terminus of MD 191
Chevy Chase	1.38	2.22	MD 410 (East–West Highway)	
Chevy Chase	2.62	4.22	I-495 (Capital Beltway) – Silver Spring, Baltimore, Frederick, Northern Virginia	Exit 33 on I-495
Kensington	4.24	6.82	MD 547 west (Knowles Avenue)	Eastern terminus of MD 547
Kensington	4.40	7.08	MD 192 east (Plyers Mill Road)	Western terminus of MD 192
Kensington	4.54	7.31	MD 193 east (University Boulevard)	Western terminus of MD 193
Kensington	4.63	7.45	Perry Road to MD 193	
Wheaton	5.92	9.53	MD 586 (Veirs Mill Road)	
Wheaton	6.32	10.17	Randolph Road	
Aspen Hill	8.30	13.36	MD 97 (Georgia Avenue)	Northern terminus; Connecticut Ave. continues north
1.000 mi = 1.609 km; 1.000 km = 0.621 mi
