= Maryland Route 192 =

State highway in Montgomery County, Maryland, United States

Maryland Route 192
- Maryland Route 192 highlighted in red

Route information
- Maintained by MDSHA
- Length: 2.53 mi (4.07 km)
- Existed: 1927–present

Major junctions
- West end: Summit Avenue in Kensington
- MD 185 in Kensington
- East end: MD 97 in Forest Glen

Location
- Country: United States
- State: Maryland
- Counties: Montgomery

Highway system
- Maryland highway system; Interstate; US; State; Scenic Byways
← MD 191	→ MD 193

Maryland Route 192 (MD 192) is a state highway in the U.S. state of Maryland. The highway runs 2.53 miles (4.07 km) from Summit Avenue in Kensington east to MD 97 in Forest Glen in Montgomery County. MD 192 connects MD 185 with the Kensington station on MARC's Brunswick Line and MD 97 and Interstate 495 (I-495) with the Forest Glen station on the Washington Metro's Red Line. The highway was constructed from Forest Glen to Kensington in the mid-1920s. MD 192 also included three sections between MD 97 and U.S. Route 29 (US 29) in Four Corners built in the mid-1930s. The final segment east of MD 97 was removed from the state highway system in the late 1980s.

== Route description ==
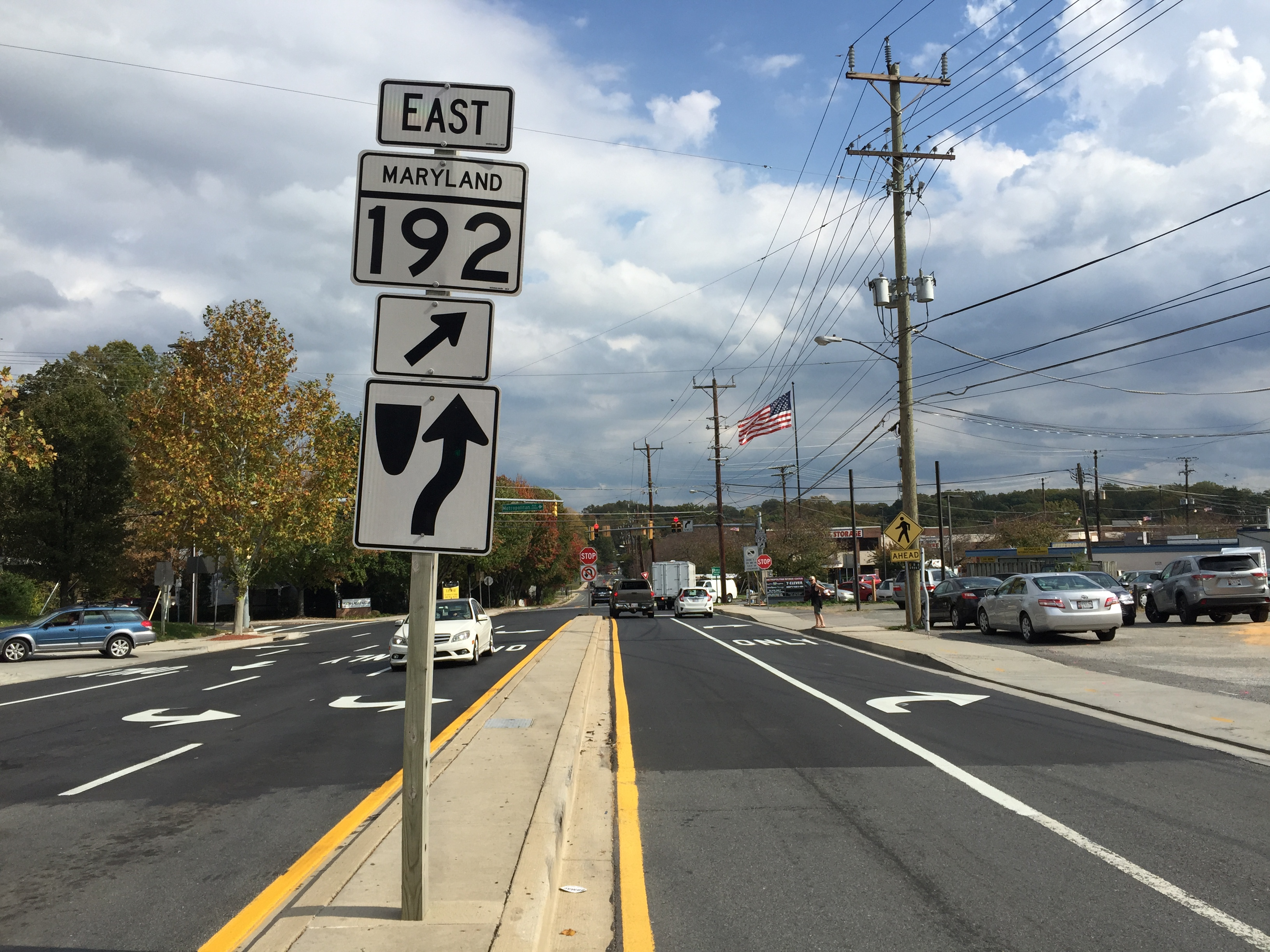
View east along MD 192 at MD 185 in Kensington

MD 192 begins on Plyers Mill Road at its intersection with Summit Avenue in the town of Kensington. The highway heads east along the two-lane undivided municipally-maintained street to its intersection with MD 185 (Connecticut Avenue), which meets the western end of MD 193 (University Boulevard) two blocks to the north. East of the MD 185 intersection, MD 192 becomes state-maintained and veers southeast onto Metropolitan Avenue. At St. Paul Street, the highway passes the Kensington station on MARC's Brunswick Line, which follows CSX's Metropolitan Subdivision railroad line. MD 192 parallels the railroad southeast out of the town of Kensington. The highway curves east away from the tracks and continues on Capitol View Avenue, which has a sharp turn to the south then a more gentle turn southeast at Stoneybrook Drive. Stoneybrook Drive leads south across the railroad to the Washington D.C. Temple of the Church of Jesus Christ of Latter-day Saints (LDS Church) and Beach Drive in Rock Creek Park.

MD 192 continues southeast and approaches the tracks again before passing through a very sharp S-curve before the Forest Glen Castle. There, the highway has a four-way intersection with Seminary Road, which continues southeast across I-495 (Capital Beltway), and Linden Lane, which heads southwest across an at-grade crossing of the rail line toward the redeveloped National Park Seminary and the U.S. Army's Forest Glen Annex. MD 192 turns east onto Forest Glen Road, which parallels the Capital Beltway east. The route expands to a four-lane divided highway at Darcy Forest Drive and passes the Forest Glen Metro station before reaching its eastern terminus at MD 97 (Georgia Avenue) just north of that highway's interchange with the Capital Beltway. Forest Glen Road continues east as a two-lane undivided county highway that passes Holy Cross Hospital and intersects Sligo Creek Parkway before ending just short of US 29 (Colesville Road) in Four Corners.

MD 192 is a part of the National Highway System as an intermodal connector from Darcy Forest Drive to MD 97 in Forest Glen.

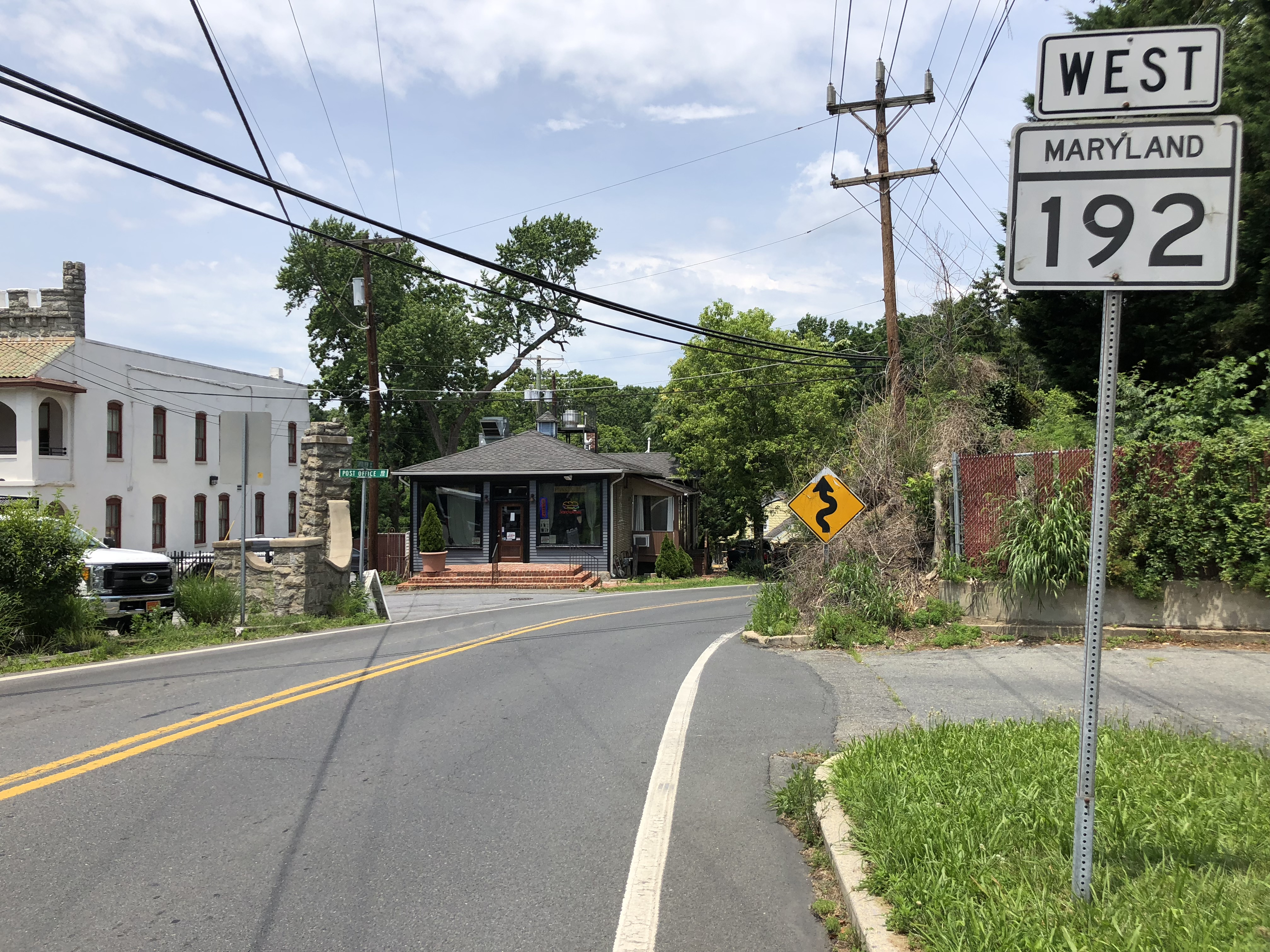
View west along MD 192 in Forest Glen

== History ==
Maryland Route 597
- Location: Silver Spring
- Existed: 1934–1946

MD 192 from the 7th Street Pike (now Georgia Avenue) west to Seminary Road was paved as a macadam road by 1923. The macadam road was extended to Kensington by 1927. MD 192's original western terminus was at St. Paul Avenue, which was the original course of MD 193. The highway was extended west along Metropolitan Avenue and Plyers Mill Road—MD 193 (now MD 185) was relocated around the center of Kensington after its grade separation of the Baltimore and Ohio Railroad (now CSX's Metropolitan Subdivision) was built in 1936—by 1950. MD 192 was extended east from MD 97 along Forest Glen Road to Sligo Creek starting in 1934. That same year, a separate segment was built on a part of Forest Glen Road then named Fairway Avenue from US 29 west to Dallas Avenue. The Fairway Avenue segment was designated MD 597 by 1939, but became part of MD 192 when the portion of Forest Glen Road between Sligo Creek and Dallas Avenue was brought into the state highway system by 1946. This middle segment between Sligo Creek Parkway and Dallas Avenue was transferred to Montgomery County by 1961. The eastern segment of MD 192, whose eastern end had been shorn off by the construction of US 29's interchange with I-495, was removed from the state highway system in 1977. The final eastern segment of MD 192 from MD 97 to Sligo Creek Parkway was transferred to county maintenance between 1989 and 1991.

== Junction list ==
The entire route is in Montgomery County.

Location	mi	km	Destinations	Notes
Kensington	0.00	0.00	Plyers Mill Road west / Summit Avenue south	Western terminus
Kensington	0.10	0.16	MD 185 (Connecticut Avenue) to MD 193 – Chevy Chase, Aspen Hill, Wheaton	
Forest Glen	2.53	4.07	MD 97 (Georgia Avenue) / Forest Glen Road east – Wheaton, Silver Spring	Eastern terminus
1.000 mi = 1.609 km; 1.000 km = 0.621 mi
