= Randolph Road =

County highway in Montgomery County, Maryland, US

- Montrose Road; Josiah Henson Memorial Parkway; Cherry Hill Road

Route information
- Maintained by Montgomery County, Prince George's County, and MDSHA
- Length: 16.8 mi (27.0 km) Montrose Road (2.4 mi (3.9 km) to Josiah Henson Memorial Parkway) Josiah Henson Memorial Parkway (1.3 mi (2.1 km)); Randolph Road (9.0 mi (14.5 km)) Cherry Hill Road (4.1 mi (6.6 km))

Major junctions
- West end: MD 189 in Potomac
- I-270 in Rockville, Maryland MD 355 in Rockville; MD 586 in Wheaton; MD 185 in Wheaton; MD 97 in Glenmont; MD 650 in Colesville; US 29 in Fairland MD 212 in Calverton
- East end: US 1 in College Park

Location
- Country: United States
- State: Maryland
- Counties: Montgomery, Prince George's

Highway system
- Maryland highway system; Interstate; US; State; Scenic Byways

Randolph Road is a county highway in the U.S. state of Maryland. The highway is the major component of a mostly four- to six-lane 16.8-mile (27.0 km) highway spanning southern Montgomery County and northwestern Prince George's County that also includes Montrose Road, Josiah Henson Memorial Parkway (née Montrose Parkway), and Cherry Hill Road, and forms an important link between eastern Montgomery County and Rockville. Montrose Road begins at Maryland Route 189 (MD 189) in Potomac. The highway heads east through a junction with Interstate 270 (I-270) before the main course continues as Josiah Henson Memorial Parkway in Rockville, Maryland. Josiah Henson Memorial Parkway continues through a junction with MD 355, east of which the highway becomes Randolph Road. Randolph Road intersects MD 586 and MD 185 in Wheaton, MD 97 in Glenmont, and MD 650 in Colesville. The highway continues southeast toward Fairland, where it meets U.S. Route 29 (US 29). The highway continues from US 29 as Cherry Hill Road through an intersection with MD 212 in Calverton before reaching its eastern end at US 1 in College Park.

A significant portion of Montrose Road, Randolph Road, and Cherry Hill Road existed along or near their present alignments by the early 20th century. The major exceptions were Montrose Road west of I-270 and Randolph Road from Rockville to Glenmont. Much of the county highways were improved as modern roads by the mid-1940s. Randolph Road from Glenmont to Colesville was originally known as Glenmont Road and constructed as Maryland Route 183 in the late 1910s. The Rockville –Glenmont stretch of Randolph Road was built as a four-lane divided highway in the 1950s and early 1960s. MD 183 was expanded to a divided highway in the mid-1970s then transferred to county control in the early 1980s. Montrose Road was reconstructed as a temporary connecting route associated with the construction of I-270 in the late 1950s; the highway was extended to Potomac in the late 1980s. The first phase of Josiah Henson Memorial Parkway (prior to 2022 named Montrose Parkway) was constructed in the late 2000s; the parkway will be extended east to MD 586 in the future.

== Route description ==
The continuous highway comprising Montrose Road, Josiah Henson Memorial Parkway, Randolph Road, and Cherry Hill Road has a total length of 16.8 miles (27.0 km) from MD 189 in Potomac to US 1 in College Park. Montrose Road runs 2.4 miles (3.9 km) from Potomac to Josiah Henson Memorial Parkway in North Bethesda. Montrose Road continues east from there, but is bypassed by Josiah Henson Memorial Parkway, which has a length of 1.3 miles (2.1 km) to its eastern end beyond MD 355. Randolph Road spans 9 miles (14 km) through Wheaton, Glenmont, Colesville, and Fairland to US 29. The highway continues as Cherry Hill Road for 4.1 miles (6.6 km) through Calverton to College Park. The vast majority of the highway is maintained by the respective counties, but short segments are maintained by the Maryland State Highway Administration (MDSHA) as unsigned MD 927 and MD 927A in Rockville and MD 929 in Fairland. The entire length of the Randolph Road portion of the highway and MD 927A, the portion of Josiah Henson Memorial Parkway through the MD 355 interchange, are part of the National Highway System as a principal arterial.

=== Montrose Road and Josiah Henson Memorial Parkway ===
Maryland Route 927
- Location: Rockville
- Length: 0.45 mi (720 m)

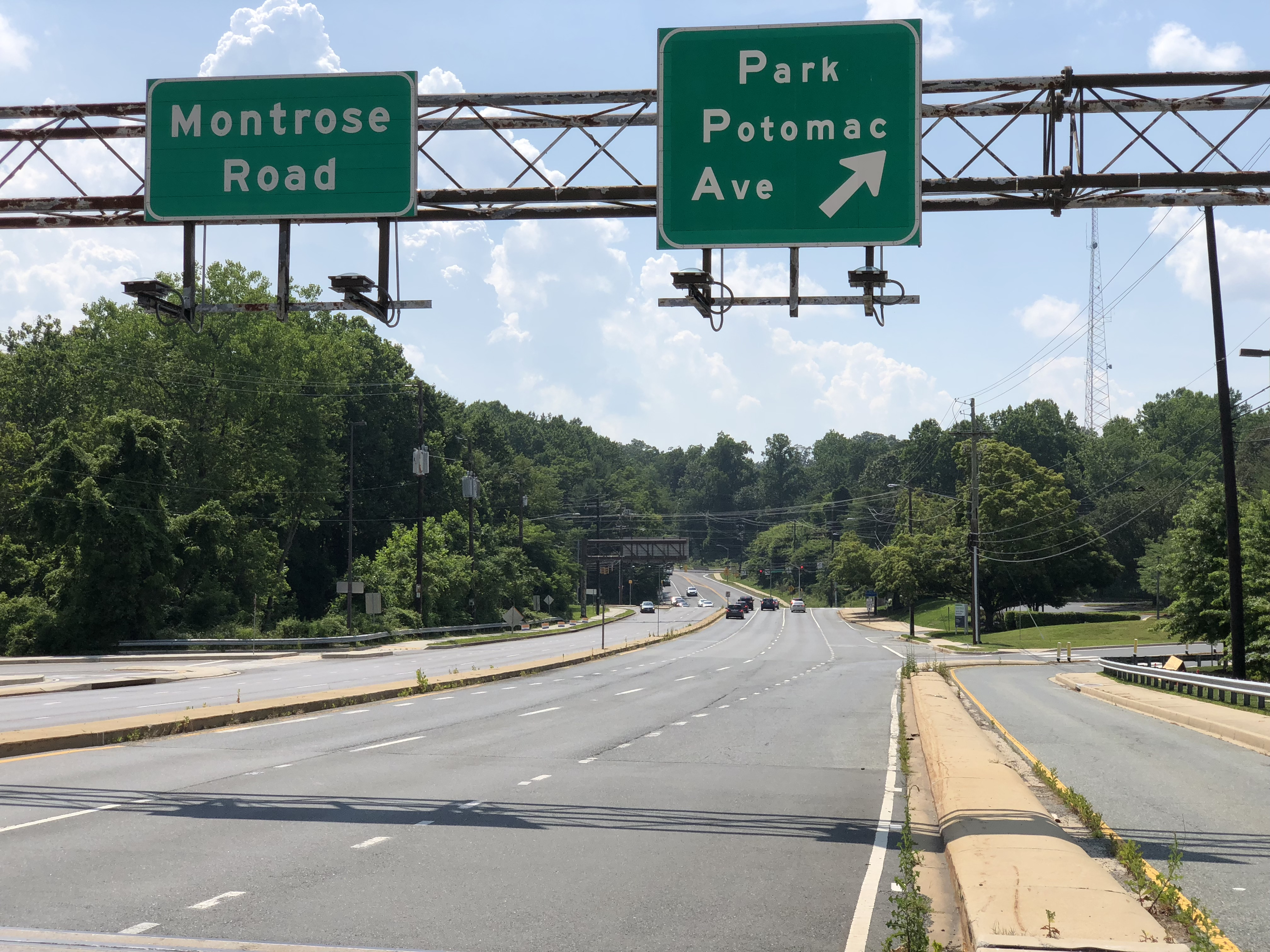
Montrose Road westbound at just west of I-270 in Potomac

Montrose Road begins at an intersection with MD 189 (Falls Road) in Potomac. The highway heads east as a two-lane controlled-access highway through a forested corridor between two residential subdivisions. Those neighborhoods are accessed via the only intersection through the corridor with Whites Ford Way. The corridor ends at Seven Locks Road, where Montrose Road expands to a four-lane divided highway. The highway has a partial interchange with the access road to a residential subdivision to the north before its cloverleaf interchange with I-270 (Eisenhower Memorial Highway). At Tower Oaks Boulevard, Montrose Road expands to six lanes, crosses Cabin John Creek, and passes between residential subdivisions between the city of Rockville to the north and unincorporated areas outside of Rockville to the south. Montrose Road is state-maintained and designated MD 927 for 0.45 miles (0.72 km) from the ramp from southbound I-270 to westbound Montrose Road east to the intersection with Tower Oaks Boulevard.

Just west of Old Farm Creek, Montrose Road turns off east as a four-lane road with center turn lane while the through highway's name becomes Josiah Henson Memorial Parkway. Josiah Henson Memorial Parkway continues east with four lanes, crossing over Old Farm Creek. The highway intersects Jefferson Street before reaching an interchange with MD 355 (Rockville Pike). Access to southbound MD 355 is provided by following Hoya Street north to the interchange ramps, where the eastern end of Montrose Road can be accessed. Josiah Henson Memorial Parkway passes under MD 355 before intersecting ramps to and from northbound MD 355 adjacent to the Montrose Schoolhouse, which is accessed from the adjacent shopping center via Chapman Avenue at the eastern end of Josiah Henson Memorial Parkway. Montrose Road is state-maintained and designated MD 927A for its easternmost 0.29 miles (0.47 km) from Hoya Street to Chapman Avenue.

=== Randolph Road ===
Randolph Road begins at Chapman Avenue and heads east as a five-lane road with center turn lane. The highway has an at-grade crossing of CSX's Metropolitan Subdivision, which carries MARC's Brunswick Line, as the highway passes through a commercial area. Randolph Road intersects Parklawn Drive before passing through a dense suburban residential area. The highway expands to three lanes eastbound at Gaynor Road, gains a median, and gains a third lane westbound immediately after crossing Rock Creek. Randolph Road heads northeast as a six-lane divided highway into Wheaton, where the highway intersects MD 586 (Veirs Mill Road) and MD 185 (Connecticut Avenue) a short distance apart. The highway continues east through a densely populated suburban area, passing by Wheaton High School and through Denley Park before meeting MD 97 (Georgia Avenue) in Glenmont.

Randolph Road continues east, passing John F. Kennedy High School and Glenallan Elementary School before reaching Kemp Mill Road. Kemp Mill Road heads south toward Brookside Gardens and Wheaton Regional Park. Randolph Road continues east across Northwest Branch and past the historic home Milimar. The highway intersects MD 650 (New Hampshire Avenue) in Colesville. After intersecting Fairland Road, Randolph Road curves to the southeast and becomes a five-lane road with center turn lane. The highway becomes four lanes with alternating median and undivided sections as it passes through a series of curves and crosses Paint Branch, then regains a center turn lane. Randolph Road expands to a divided highway just west of its intersection with Old Columbia Pike, then reaches its eastern terminus at a single-point urban interchange with US 29 (Columbia Pike) in Fairland. The highway is state-maintained and designated MD 929A for 0.31 miles (0.50 km) from west of Old Columbia Pike—which is itself designated MD 929C for a short distance on either side of the intersection—east to the bridge over US 29.

=== Cherry Hill Road ===
Cherry Hill Road begins where Randolph Road ends at the US 29 interchange in Fairland. The highway is state-maintained and designated MD 929B for 0.25 miles (0.40 km) from the bridge over US 29 to east of Prosperity Drive, which is itself designated MD 929D for a short distance south of Cherry Hill Road. Cherry Hill Road transitions from a four-lane divided highway to a four-lane undivided highway as it curves to the southeast through Calverton, where the highway is lined with commercial properties to the south and apartment complexes to the north. The highway passes along the eastern edge of the White Oak Food and Drug Administration campus, then enters Prince George's County shortly before reaching an intersection with MD 212 (Powder Mill Road). Cherry Hill Road is four lanes with a center turn lane from the county line to just east of its bridge across I-95, then reduces to two lanes. The highway briefly passes through the United States Department of Agriculture's Beltsville Agricultural Research Center before crossing over the Capital Beltway, which carries both I-95 and I-495, just east of the junction of the two Interstates. Cherry Hill Road crosses Little Paint Branch and passes by the Cherry Hill Park Campground, then passes a shopping center before reaching its eastern terminus at US 1 (Baltimore Avenue) in College Park.

== History ==
Maryland Route 183
- Location: Glenmont–Colesville
- Existed: 1927–1981

Most of the county highways along the Montrose–Randolph–Cherry Hill corridor already existed by the early 20th century. Their courses remained mostly unchanged through the mid-1940s. Montrose Road began at Seven Locks Road and, after a tight curve south and back north to cross Cabin John Creek, followed the present course of Montrose Road to the junction of the old and new Rockville–Georgetown roads at Montrose. In 1910, Montrose Road ended at the Baltimore and Ohio Railroad (now CSX) crossing at Randolph. By 1945, the highway was extended along the Randolph Road alignment to just west of Rock Creek, where the road turned north along Gaynor Road to cross Rock Creek and end at MD 586. After a large gap from west of Rock Creek to Glenmont, the highway resumed along the present course of Randolph Road except for a deviation at Northwest Branch. From Colesville, the highway headed east along the Beltsville Road. Near the Montgomery–Prince George's county line, the highway split southeast along Cherry Hill Road to US 1. The only major deviations were near their junction, Beltsville Road and Cherry Hill Road followed what is now Gracefield Road, and Cherry Hill Road met MD 212 at staggered intersections.

Between 1916 and 1919, the highway between Glenmont and Colesville was improved as a macadam road by Montgomery County with state aid; this road later became known as Glenmont Road and was designated MD 183. The road east from Colesville and part of the Beltsville road were reconstructed as gravel roads in 1934. Montrose Road was paved from US 240 (now MD 355) west to near Cabin John Creek by 1944. By that time, the road had been extended as a gravel road from the railroad to just west of Rock Creek, where the highway became dirt for its old crossing of Rock Creek on Gaynor Road. The highway was paved from US 29 (now MD 650) at Colesville to east of Fairland Road, then gravel to MD 196 (Old Columbia Pike). The pavement resumed there until the Beltsville–Cherry Hill split, from which Cherry Hill Road continued to US 1 as a gravel road. Cherry Hill Road was moved to its present alignment, replacing Gracefield Road, in 1985. The staggered intersections at MD 212 were unified by 1999.

The first segments of four-lane divided Randolph Road were in place by 1951. These segments formed the main streets of their respective subdivisions from Dewey Road just east of Rock Creek to MD 586 and from Lindell Street to the MD 97–MD 183 intersection. Randolph Road's original two-lane bridge across Rock Creek was built in 1953. By 1956, Randolph Road was built between Rockville and Glenmont except for a gap between Connecticut Avenue and Bushey Drive to the west halfway to MD 586. The gap in Randolph Road was filled by 1965. That same year, the bridge across Rock Creek was expanded to allow four lanes. By 1968, the Randolph Road name was applied from MD 355 to US 29. MD 183 was expanded to a divided highway and Randolph Road was placed on its present course at Northwest Branch in 1976. Randolph Road between Glenmont and Colesville was transferred from state to county maintenance in 1981. Randolph Road and Cherry Hill Road's interchange with US 29 was constructed in 2004 and 2005. MDSHA plans to construction an urban diamond interchange at the intersection of Randolph Road and MD 97. Four lanes of Randolph Road will pass under MD 97 while flanking two-lane roadways intersect the state highway and several streets on either side of the interchange. Construction began in 2014 and concluded in 2019.

Montrose Road was straightened out at Cabin John Creek when its bridge across the new Washington National Pike (now I-270) was built in 1956. The county highway temporarily served as US 240 between 1958 and 1960 while Washington National Pike was under construction from Montrose Road south to Rockville Pike. Montrose Road's interchange with the freeway was originally a six-ramp partial cloverleaf. Between 1988 and 1991, in conjunction with the expansion of I-270 to 12 lanes, the junction was reconstructed as a full cloverleaf interchange plus ramps with Tower Oaks Boulevard. Montrose Road was extended west from Seven Locks Road to MD 189 in 1989. Montrose Parkway, since renamed Josiah Henson Memorial Parkway, was conceived as an expansion of MDSHA's plans to construct an interchange between MD 355 and Montrose Road and Randolph Road. In the original plans, which were to be implemented by MDSHA, the west side of the interchange would connect directly with Montrose Road at Hoya Street (now Towne Road). Randolph Road would head east from the interchange, cross Nebel Street and the railroad north of Randolph Road's existing grade crossing, and merge back into Randolph Road west of Parklawn Drive.

The first phase of the creation of Josiah Henson Memorial Parkway included the reconstruction of Montrose Road from Tower Oaks Boulevard to west of Old Farm Creek and construction of Josiah Henson Memorial Parkway from the creek area to the MD 355 interchange. The Montrose Road reconstruction and Montrose Parkway (since renamed Josiah Henson Memorial Parkway) east to Jefferson Street were started in 2005 and finished in 2008. As the first segment opened, Montgomery County began to work on linking Josiah Henson Memorial Parkway and Randolph Road and MDSHA began constructing the highways' interchange at MD 355. The parkway segment between Jefferson Street and Hoya Street (now Towne Road) opened in 2009 and the MD 355 interchange opened in 2010. For the next phase of the project, MDSHA will construct Josiah Henson Memorial Parkway's bridge across the railroad and a single-point urban interchange at Parklawn Drive north of Randolph Road. From there, Montgomery County will extend the highway across Rock Creek to MD 586. It has not yet been decided whether the Randolph Road grade crossing will be closed or retained.

In 2022, Montrose Parkway was renamed Josiah Henson Parkway, to honor a once-enslaved Methodist preacher whose autobiography inspired “Uncle Tom’s Cabin”.

== Junction list ==
County	Location	mi	km	Destinations	Notes
Montgomery	Potomac	0.0	0.0	MD 189 (Falls Road) – Rockville, Great Falls	Western terminus of Montrose Road
Montgomery	Rockville	1.4	2.3	I-270 (Eisenhower Memorial Highway) – Frederick, Washington	I-270 Exit 4
Montgomery	Rockville	2.4	3.9	Montrose Road east	Western terminus of Montrose Parkway
Montgomery	Rockville	3.4	5.5	Hoya Street to MD 355 south (Rockville Pike) / Montrose Road west – Rockville	
Montgomery	Rockville	3.6	5.8	MD 355 north (Rockville Pike) – Rockville	half-diamond interchange with northbound MD 355
Montgomery	Rockville	3.7	6.0	Chapman Avenue north / Maple Avenue south	Eastern terminus of Montrose Parkway; western terminus of Randolph Road
Montgomery	Wheaton	5.4	8.7	MD 586 (Veirs Mill Road) – Rockville, Silver Spring	
Montgomery	Wheaton	5.9	9.5	MD 185 (Connecticut Avenue) – Kensington, Aspen Hill	
Montgomery	Glenmont	7.3	11.7	MD 97 (Georgia Avenue) – Wheaton, Olney	Single-point urban interchange
Montgomery	Colesville	10.2	16.4	MD 650 (New Hampshire Avenue) – White Oak, Cloverly	
Montgomery	Fairland	13.5	21.7	US 29 (Columbia Pike) / Cherry Hill Road east – Silver Spring, Columbia	Single-point urban interchange; eastern terminus of Randolph Road; western terminus of Cherry Hill Road
Prince George's	Calverton	15.4	24.8	MD 212 (Powder Mill Road) – Beltsville, Adelphi	
Prince George's	College Park	16.8	27.0	US 1 (Baltimore Avenue) – Beltsville, Hyattsville, University of Maryland	Eastern terminus of Cherry Hill Road
1.000 mi = 1.609 km; 1.000 km = 0.621 mi
