= Norbeck Intrusive Suite =

- Stratigraphic range: Ordovician
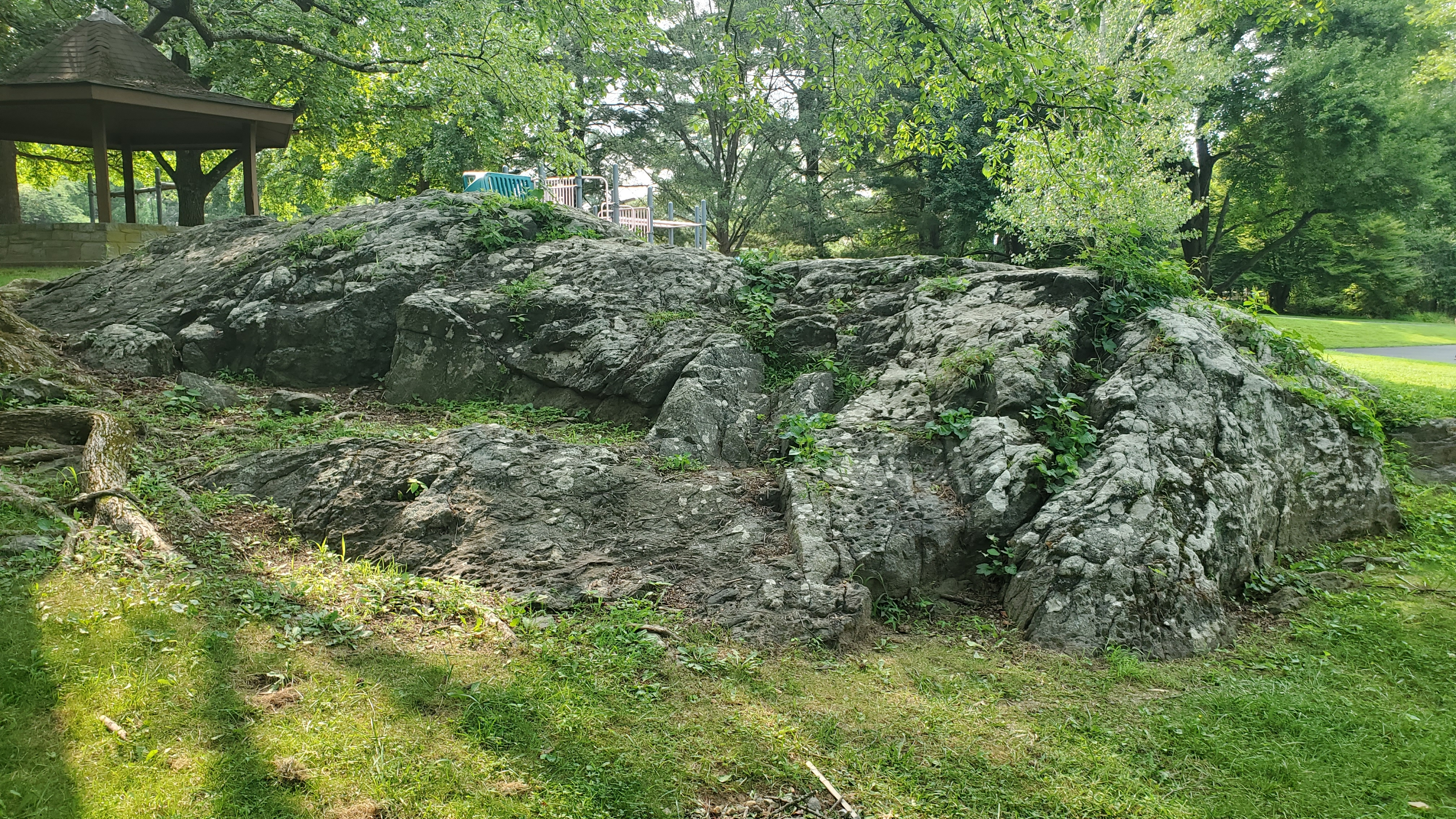
- Outcrop of tonalite at Greenwood Local Park, Brookeville
- Type: igneous

Lithology
- Primary: tonalite, metadiorite, metagabbro

Location
- Region: Piedmont of Maryland
- Extent: Montgomery County

Type section
- Named for: Norbeck, Maryland
- Named by: C. A. Hopson, 1964

The Norbeck Intrusive Suite is an Ordovician granitic pluton in Montgomery County, Maryland. The intrusive suite was originally mapped as the Norbeck Quartz Diorite by Hopson, and is shown as such on the Geologic Map of Maryland of 1968. A. A. Drake later revised the name after more detailed mapping. It intrudes through the Wissahickon Formation.

== Description ==
Three lithologies were mapped in the Kensington quadrangle by Drake:

- medium- to coarse-grained, fairly massive to foliated biotite-hornblende tonalite that contains xenoliths and/or autoliths of more mafic rock
- medium-grained, quartz-augite-hornblende metagabbro that forms small bodies within the tonalite
- dark-green, well-foliated ultramafic rocks of serpentine and lesser soapstone
