= Montrose Schoolhouse =

- U.S. National Register of Historic Places
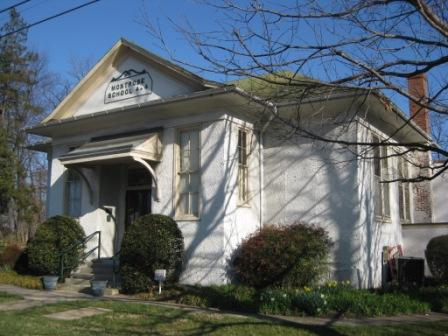

- Location within Maryland Location within the United States
- Location: 5721 Randolph Road, Rockville, Maryland 20852
- Coordinates: 39°03′13″N 77°06′53″W
- Area: 1 acre (0.40 ha)
- Built: 1909
- Built by: T. C. Groomes
- Website: peerlessrockville.org
- NRHP reference No.: 83002956
- Added to NRHP: January 24, 1983

The Montrose School House is a historic school building located in Rockville, Montgomery County, Maryland, United States.(Archive). U.S. Census Bureau. Retrieved on April 30, 2014.. It is a one-story, rectangular, hip-roofed building of frame construction with a pebble-dash finish. It is the best-preserved of the six functional school buildings constructed in Montgomery County around 1910.

It was listed on the National Register of Historic Places in 1983.
