= South Kensington, Maryland =

- Census-designated place
- Coordinates: 39°01′00″N 77°04′04″W
- Country: United States
- State: Maryland
- County: Montgomery

Area
  - Total: 2.13 sq mi (5.52 km^{2})
  - Land: 2.09 sq mi (5.42 km^{2})
  - Water: 0.035 sq mi (0.09 km^{2})
- Elevation: 272 ft (83 m)

Population (2020)
  - Total: 8,829
  - Density: 4,217.4/sq mi (1,628.35/km^{2})
- Time zone: UTC−5 (Eastern (EST))
  - Summer (DST): UTC−4 (EDT)
- FIPS code: 24-73600
- GNIS feature ID: 2390320

South Kensington is a census-designated place and an unincorporated area in Montgomery County, Maryland, United States. It had a population of 8,829 in 2020.

== Geography ==
As an unincorporated area, South Kensington's boundaries are not officially defined. South Kensington is, however, recognized by the United States Census Bureau and by the United States Geological Survey as a census-designated place.

According to the United States Census Bureau, the place has a total area of 2.1 square miles (5.5 km^{2}), all land.

== Demographics ==
Historical population
Census	Pop.	Note	%±
1970	10,289		—
1980	9,344		−9.2%
1990	8,777		−6.1%
2000	7,877		−10.3%
2010	8,462		7.4%
2020	8,829		4.3%
source: 2010–2020

=== 2020 census ===
As of the 2020 census, South Kensington had a population of 8,829. The median age was 43.8 years. 26.0% of residents were under the age of 18 and 18.9% of residents were 65 years of age or older. For every 100 females there were 93.7 males, and for every 100 females age 18 and over there were 88.3 males age 18 and over.

100.0% of residents lived in urban areas, while 0.0% lived in rural areas.

There were 3,003 households in South Kensington, of which 42.3% had children under the age of 18 living in them. Of all households, 70.2% were married-couple households, 9.0% were households with a male householder and no spouse or partner present, and 17.8% were households with a female householder and no spouse or partner present. About 16.6% of all households were made up of individuals and 9.6% had someone living alone who was 65 years of age or older.

There were 3,104 housing units, of which 3.3% were vacant. The homeowner vacancy rate was 1.0% and the rental vacancy rate was 3.7%.

Racial composition as of the 2020 census
Race	Number	Percent
White	6,950	78.7%
Black or African American	312	3.5%
American Indian and Alaska Native	20	0.2%
Asian	444	5.0%
Native Hawaiian and Other Pacific Islander	7	0.1%
Some other race	147	1.7%
Two or more races	949	10.7%
Hispanic or Latino (of any race)	714	8.1%

=== 2000 census ===
As of the 2000 census, there were 7,887 people, 3,061 households, and 2,170 families residing in the area. The population density was 3,699.2 inhabitants per square mile (1,428.3/km^{2}). There were 3,120 housing units at an average density of 1,463.4 per square mile (565.0/km^{2}). The racial makeup of the area was 92.08% White, 2.42% African American, 0.15% Native American, 2.83% Asian, 0.05% Pacific Islander, 0.95% from other races, and 1.52% from two or more races. Hispanic or Latino of any race were 4.88% of the population.

There were 3,061 households, out of which 33.2% had children under the age of 18 living with them, 61.9% were married couples living together, 6.9% had a female householder with no husband present, and 29.1% were non-families. 23.0% of all households were made up of individuals, and 11.2% had someone living alone who was 65 years of age or older. The average household size was 2.52 and the average family size was 2.99.

In the area, the population was spread out, with 24.1% under the age of 18, 3.0% from 18 to 24, 28.7% from 25 to 44, 26.4% from 45 to 64, and 17.7% who were 65 years of age or older. The median age was 42 years. For every 100 females, there were 89.1 males. For every 100 females age 18 and over, there were 84.2 males.

The median income for a household in the area was $102,048, and the median income for a family was $111,753. Males had a median income of $73,558 versus $52,260 for females. The per capita income for the area was $44,755. About 1.4% of families and 1.5% of the population were below the poverty line, including 1.0% of those under age 18 and 2.4% of those age 65 or over.
