= Fairland, Maryland =

- census-designated place
- Location of Fairland, Maryland
- Coordinates: 39°04′49″N 76°57′10″W
- Country: United States
- State: Maryland
- County: Montgomery

Area
  - Total: 4.98 sq mi (12.90 km^{2})
  - Land: 4.97 sq mi (12.86 km^{2})
  - Water: 0.019 sq mi (0.05 km^{2})
- Elevation: 407 ft (124 m)

Population (2020)
  - Total: 25,396
  - Density: 5,114.9/sq mi (1,974.89/km^{2})
- Time zone: UTC−5 (Eastern (EST))
  - Summer (DST): UTC−4 (EDT)
- FIPS code: 24-27250
- GNIS feature ID: 2389060

Fairland is a census-designated place and an unincorporated area in Montgomery County, Maryland, United States. It had a population of 25,396 per the 2020 census.

== Geography ==
As an unincorporated area, Fairland's boundaries are not officially defined. Fairland is, however, recognized by the United States Census Bureau and by the United States Geological Survey as a census-designated place. Fairland is one of the many neighborhoods of Silver Spring.

According to the United States Census Bureau, the place has a total area of 5.0 square miles (13 km^{2}), all land.

== Demographics ==
Historical population
| Census | Pop. | Note | %± |
|---|---|---|---|
| 2010 | 23,681 | | — |
| 2020 | 25,396 | | 7.2% |
U.S. Decennial Census; 2010 2020

=== Racial and ethnic composition ===
Fairland CDP, Maryland – Racial and ethnic composition Note: the US Census treats Hispanic/Latino as an ethnic category. This table excludes Latinos from the racial categories and assigns them to a separate category. Hispanics/Latinos may be of any race.
| Race / Ethnicity (NH = Non-Hispanic) | Pop 2010 | Pop 2020 | % 2010 | % 2020 |
|---|---|---|---|---|
| White alone (NH) | 4,680 | 3,269 | 19.76% | 12.87% |
| Black or African American alone (NH) | 11,916 | 14,399 | 50.32% | 56.70% |
| Native American or Alaska Native alone (NH) | 43 | 31 | 0.18% | 0.12% |
| Asian alone (NH) | 3,415 | 2,909 | 14.42% | 11.45% |
| Pacific Islander alone (NH) | 14 | 20 | 0.06% | 0.08% |
| Some Other Race alone (NH) | 103 | 192 | 0.43% | 0.76% |
| Mixed race or Multiracial (NH) | 674 | 891 | 2.85% | 3.51% |
| Hispanic or Latino (any race) | 2,836 | 3,685 | 11.98% | 14.51% |
| Total | 23,681 | 25,396 | 100.00% | 100.00% |

=== 2020 census ===
As of the 2020 census, Fairland had a population of 25,396. The median age was 36.0 years. 24.6% of residents were under the age of 18 and 12.1% of residents were 65 years of age or older. For every 100 females there were 84.9 males, and for every 100 females age 18 and over there were 80.0 males age 18 and over.

100.0% of residents lived in urban areas, while 0.0% lived in rural areas.

There were 9,114 households in Fairland, of which 36.8% had children under the age of 18 living in them. Of all households, 41.4% were married-couple households, 16.1% were households with a male householder and no spouse or partner present, and 36.7% were households with a female householder and no spouse or partner present. About 24.9% of all households were made up of individuals and 6.4% had someone living alone who was 65 years of age or older.

There were 9,503 housing units, of which 4.1% were vacant. The homeowner vacancy rate was 0.8% and the rental vacancy rate was 5.3%.

Racial composition as of the 2020 census
| Race | Number | Percent |
|---|---|---|
| White | 3,656 | 14.4% |
| Black or African American | 14,631 | 57.6% |
| American Indian and Alaska Native | 122 | 0.5% |
| Asian | 2,931 | 11.5% |
| Native Hawaiian and Other Pacific Islander | 31 | 0.1% |
| Some other race | 2,113 | 8.3% |
| Two or more races | 1,912 | 7.5% |
| Hispanic or Latino (of any race) | 3,685 | 14.5% |

=== 2000 census ===
At the 2000 census there were 21,738 people, 8,612 households, and 5,460 families living in the area. The population density was 4,355.2 inhabitants per square mile (1,681.6/km^{2}). There were 8,918 housing units at an average density of 1,786.7 per square mile (689.8/km^{2}). The racial makeup of the area was 35.75% White, 42.99% African American, 0.25% Native American, 14.51% Asian, 0.03% Pacific Islander, 2.93% from other races, and 3.55% from two or more races. Latinos were 6.72%.

Of the 8,612 households 34.8% had children under the age of 18 living with them, 42.4% were married couples living together, 17.0% had a female householder with no husband present, and 36.6% were non-families. 27.1% of households were one person and 2.2% were one person aged 65 or older. The average household size was 2.50 and the average family size was 3.11.

The age distribution was 25.4% under the age of 18, 9.1% from 18 to 24, 39.9% from 25 to 44, 19.9% from 45 to 64, and 5.6% 65 or older. The median age was 32 years. For every 100 females, there were 83.2 males. For every 100 females age 18 and over, there were 78.2 males.

The median household income was $56,624 and the median family income was $62,189. Males had a median income of $46,123 versus $38,962 for females. The per capita income for the area was $28,603. About 4.6% of families and 5.3% of the population were below the poverty line, including 5.2% of those under age 18 and 10.6% of those age 65 or over.
