= Norbeck, Maryland =

- Unincorporated area
- Norbeck
- Aerial view of Norbeck, mid-1980s
- Interactive map of Norbeck, Maryland
- Coordinates: 39°06′36″N 77°04′33″W
- Country: United States
- State: Maryland
- County: Montgomery
- Website: http://www.norbeck.org/

Norbeck is the area of Montgomery County, Maryland, United States, around Norbeck Road (Maryland Route 28) east of Georgia Avenue to Layhill Road. Shortly before the Civil War, free blacks founded Norbeck as Mount Pleasant.

== History ==
The Sandy Spring Museum describes Norbeck as:

Southwestern outpost of the greater Sandy Spring neighborhood [and] put down roots as a free-black community shortly before the Civil War. With emancipation, it grew with the largest population concentrated in a community known as Mt. Pleasant between present Georgia Avenue and Muncaster Mill Road. In Mt. Pleasant were a church, school, and meeting hall, along with a store run by whites. White families, too, settled along the area's intersecting roads. Unlike most Sandy Spring crossroads, Norbeck was slow to sprout the usual general store and blacksmith/wheelwright shops. Not until the 1880s did a store and post office open, and another decade elapsed before a smith set up shop. By 1900 A.E. Stonestreet was operating his large store and the postal service, Walter H. White owned the blacksmith shop—and Norbeck's commercial course was set.

The Norbeck Citizens Association, established by the African American community that existed along Norbeck Road in the mid 1970s, described in 2002:

This area of Montgomery County is one of small streets with a rural atmosphere. The side streets were developed some time ago, prior to the massive spread of the Washington suburbs. As such, there are many areas of woods and mature trees, and no commercial development. It is also very convenient to many Washington DC [sic] areas, with Rockville Pike's commercial corridor being a quick drive west on Route 28, the District being south on Georgia Avenue, and Baltimore and other parts of Maryland to the east. Being on the outer edge of the densest part of suburban Washington DC, [sic] it is also now an area under intense pressure for change.

== Geography ==
Norbeck is located south of Olney and north of Aspen Hill.

== Geology ==
The Norbeck Intrusive Suite, an Ordovician granitic pluton, is the local bedrock.

== Notable people ==
- Camille Cosby, (b 1944) is an American television producer, philanthropist.
