= Matthew Henson State Park =

Publicly owned greenway in Maryland, US

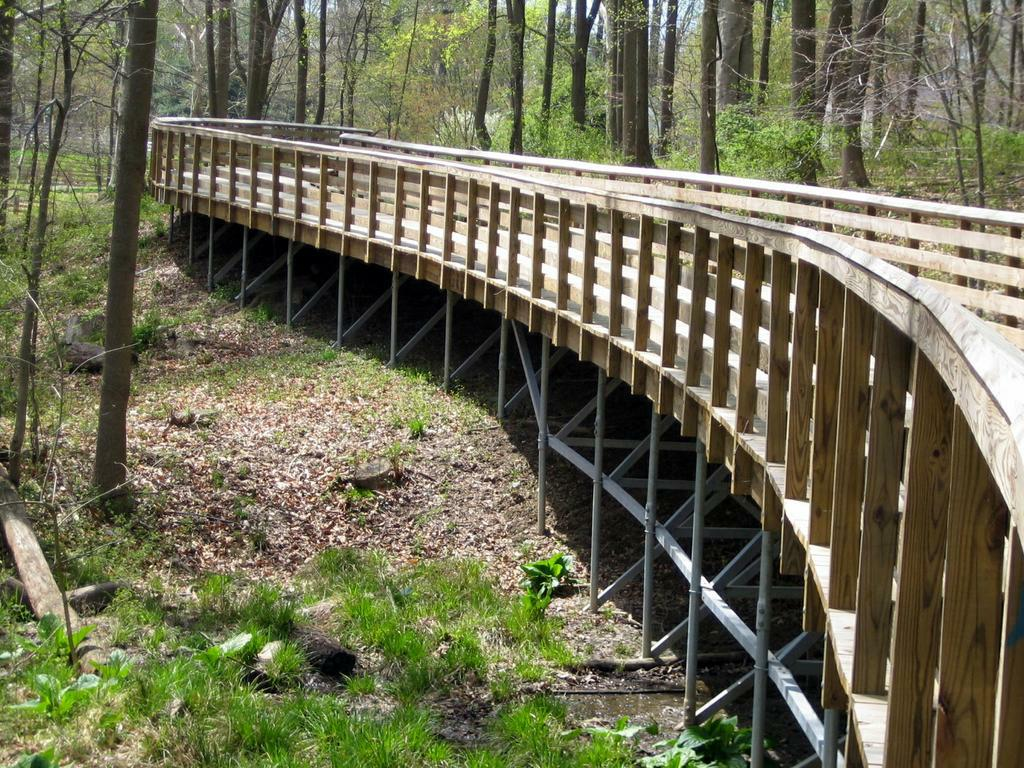
- Boardwalk section of Matthew Henson Trail

- Location within Maryland
- Location: Montgomery County, Maryland, United States
- Coordinates: 39°04′40″N 77°03′53″W
- Area: 100 acres (40 ha)
- Established: 1989
- Administrator: Montgomery County Department of Parks
- Designation: Maryland state park
- Website: Official website

Matthew Henson State Park is a Maryland state park and greenway situated along a tributary of Rock Creek in Montgomery County, Maryland. The park is managed by Montgomery County under an agreement with the Maryland Department of Natural Resources. It was named for Maryland native and arctic explorer Matthew Henson.

Matthew Henson Trail, an 8-foot-wide (2.4 m) hard surface hiking/biking trail, was completed through the park in 2009. The trail runs 4.5 miles (7.2 km) from the Rock Creek Hiker-Biker Trail near Aspen Hill northeast to Alderton Road near Layhill. The trail features 0.6 miles (0.97 km) of wooden boardwalk through environmentally sensitive areas.

== History ==
Purchased by the state in the 1950s, the land was originally called the Rockville Facility, which would have connected to Montrose Parkway as a spur to the proposed Washington Outer Beltway. In response to residents' calls to the preserve the stream valley corridor, the state legislature designated 83 acres of the land as a state park and 117 acres as a county park in 1989. The state land is owned by the Maryland Department of Natural Resources, and the county land is owned by the Maryland-National Capital Park and Planning Commission (M-NCPPC).

Planning for the Matthew Henson Trail began in 2001. After many public meetings and environmental studies, the trail's preliminary plan was approved by the Montgomery County Planning Board in 2003. Funding was put forth in 2006. The Montgomery County Department of Transportation paid for the design and construction, but the M-NCPPC managed the project. Opened May 9, 2009, the project cost $5.7 million. The trail connects with the Rock Creek Hiker-Biker Trail at Winding Creek Local Park on Dewey Road and continues northeast to Alderton Road. The trail includes ten-foot-wide boardwalks to protect the most sensitive areas and solar-powered emergency cellular phones. The trail's design and construction were nominated for a Planning & Design Award as part of the 2010 National Trails Awards.

Since opening, the Veirs Mill Road crossing has been redesigned several times for safety. Some time shortly after opening the crosswalk was painted. Then, after a cyclist was killed using the crossing in 2015, the state added a yellow, flashing light and signs alerting drivers. When a second cyclist was killed 6 months later, the state switched to a HAWK beacon. Then in 2020, they upgraded again, replacing the button-activated flashing pedestrian signal with a full color traffic signal equipped with both a call button and sensors that alert drivers to slow down. They also upgraded to a "continental" crosswalk that is more visible to motorists, replaced the zig-zag crossing with a straight-line crossing in the median and installed “passive detection” — a system in which sensors detect pedestrians and bicyclists standing in the flat landing area and activate the pedestrian signal.
