= Aspen Hill, Maryland =

- Census-designated place
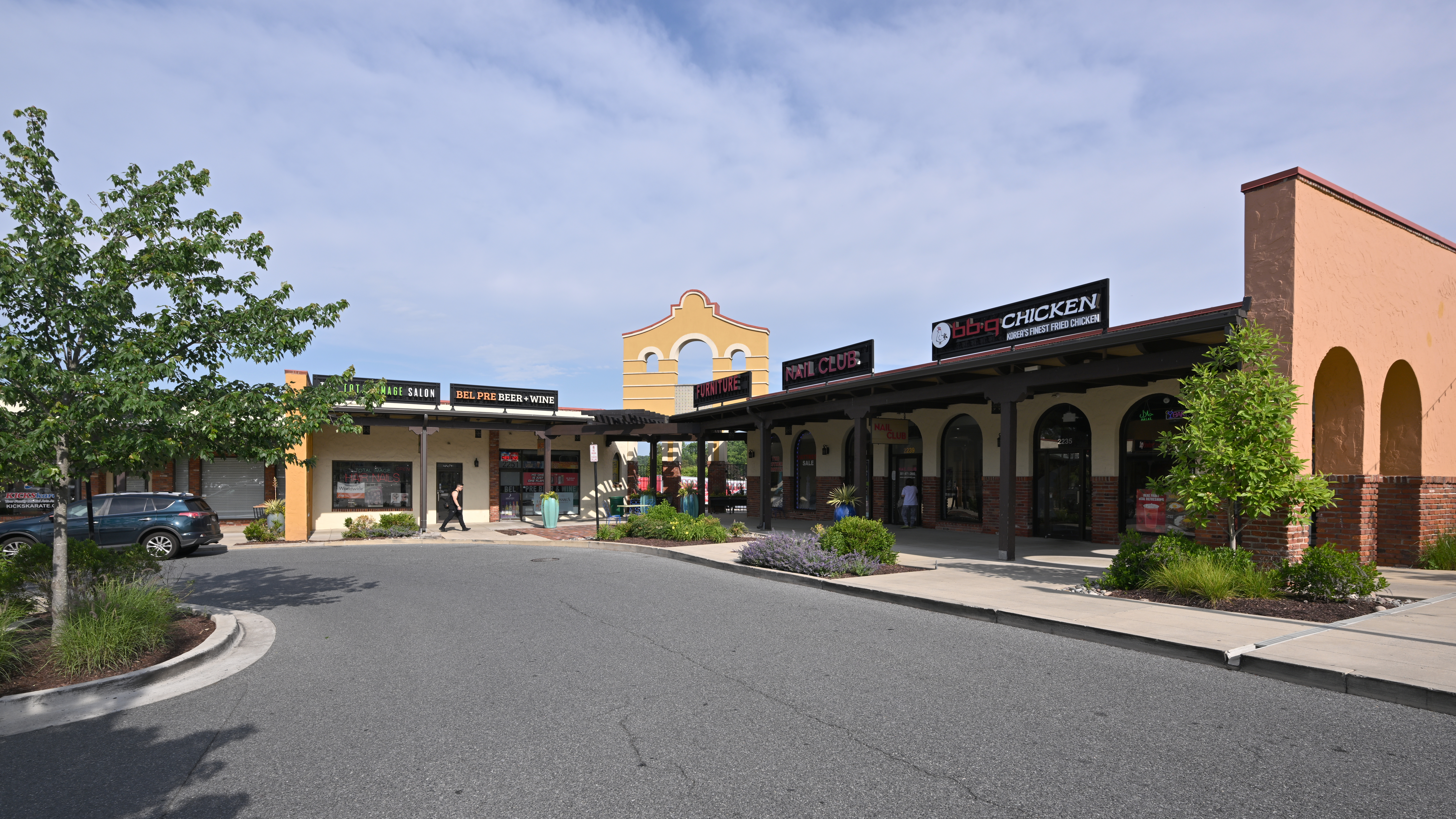

- Location of Aspen Hill, Maryland
- Coordinates: 39°05′44″N 77°06′19″W
- Country: United States
- State: Maryland
- County: Montgomery

Area
  - Total: 9.58 sq mi (24.81 km^{2})
  - Land: 9.50 sq mi (24.60 km^{2})
  - Water: 0.081 sq mi (0.21 km^{2})
- Elevation: 420 ft (130 m)

Population (2020)
  - Total: 51,063
  - Density: 5,376.3/sq mi (2,075.79/km^{2})
- Time zone: UTC−5 (Eastern (EST))
  - Summer (DST): UTC−4 (EDT)
- ZIP codes: 20853, 20906, 20916
- Area codes: 301, 240
- FIPS code: 24-02825
- GNIS feature ID: 2389154

Aspen Hill is a census-designated place and an unincorporated area in Montgomery County, Maryland, United States. It is located 6 miles north of Washington D.C. Its population as of the 2020 census was 51,063.

== Etymology ==
The community name is derived from aspen trees that once were found near the first post office in the area. The post office was located in a general store on what was then known as the Washington-Brookeville Pike (now the intersection of Connecticut and Georgia Avenues) and opened circa 1864.

== History ==
In the 1920s and 1930s, Aspen Hill was known as being the location of Aspin Hill Memorial Park, one of three pet cemeteries then operating on the East Coast of the United States. Burials at Aspen Hill Cemetery included dogs that had served the during World War I as well as the pets of area residents. Memorial ceremonies honoring pets were often held there on World Day for Animals.

In July 1950, Louis M. Denit sold 517 acres (2.1 km^{2}) of land in Aspen Hill to Gelman Construction Company for about $300,000. Denit was a well-known attorney who specialized in banking and trust law. Gelman Construction Company bought the land to build 2,450 three-bedroom ramblers, a shopping center, schools, playgrounds, and churches. The homes were priced at less $10,000 each.

In January 1955, Minnie Goodman sold 268 acres (1.1 km^{2}) of land in Aspen Hill to Metropolitan Homes, Inc. The land was the last vacant tract of land of its size between Rockville and Wheaton. Metropolitan Homes planned to build 12,000 homes, schools, shopping centers, and churches on the land. Prices for the homes started at $15,000 each.

Aspen Hill was one of the locations in which a fatal shooting took place on October 3, 2002, and another on October 23, 2002, as part of the Beltway sniper attacks.

== Geography ==
As a census-designated place, Aspen Hill's boundaries are defined by the U.S. Census Bureau. The United States Postal Service does not accept “Aspen Hill” as a place name; addresses in the community must use the place names Rockville, Silver Spring, or Wheaton.

Some addresses use Wheaton (20906), notably in the Aspen Hill Shopping Center, while immediately across Aspen Hill Road at the Northgate Plaza Shopping Center, the addresses use Silver Spring (20906). Immediately to the west across Connecticut Avenue, addresses use Rockville (20853).

The United States Census Bureau, defines Aspen Hill as a census-designated place located at 39°6' North, 77°5' West. In the 2000 Census Bureau Gazetteer, Aspen Hill was located at 39°5′19″N 77°4′49″W (39.088525, −77.080267).

According to the United States Census Bureau, the community has a total area of 10.5 square miles (27 km^{2}), of which 10.5 square miles (27 km^{2}) is land and 0.1 square miles (0.26 km^{2}) (0.57%) is water.

== Education ==
Aspen Hill is served by Bel Pre, Wheaton Woods, Lucy V. Barnsley, Brookhaven, Flower Valley, Harmony Hills, and Strathmore elementary schools. Older students living in Aspen Hill generally attend Earle B. Wood Middle School, Parkland Middle School, or Argyle Middle School. Rockville High School, Wheaton High School, and Kennedy High School serve Aspen Hill's teenagers.

Melvin J. Berman Hebrew Academy is in Aspen Hill CDP.

== Demographics ==
Historical population
Census	Pop.	Note	%±
1970	16,887		—
1980	47,455		181.0%
1990	45,494		−4.1%
2000	50,228		10.4%
2010	48,759		−2.9%
2020	51,063		4.7%
source: 2010–2020

=== Racial and ethnic composition ===
Aspen Hill CDP, Maryland – Racial and ethnic composition Note: the US Census treats Hispanic/Latino as an ethnic category. This table excludes Latinos from the racial categories and assigns them to a separate category. Hispanics/Latinos may be of any race.
Race / Ethnicity (NH = Non-Hispanic)	Pop 2000	Pop 2010	Pop 2020	% 2000	% 2010	% 2020
White alone (NH)	24,701	18,145	15,098	49.18%	37.21%	29.57%
Black or African American alone (NH)	10,330	10,200	9,318	20.57%	20.92%	18.25%
Native American or Alaska Native alone (NH)	114	107	69	0.23%	0.22%	0.14%
Asian alone (NH)	5,747	5,241	5,625	11.44%	10.75%	11.02%
Native Hawaiian or Pacific Islander alone (NH)	28	18	19	0.06%	0.04%	0.04%
Other race alone (NH)	242	362	731	0.48%	0.74%	1.43%
Mixed race or Multiracial (NH)	1,309	1,093	2,502	2.61%	2.24%	4.90%
Hispanic or Latino (any race)	7,757	13,593	17,701	15.44%	27.88%	34.67%
Total	50,228	48,759	51,063	100.00%	100.00%	100.00%

=== 2020 census ===
As of the 2020 census, Aspen Hill had a population of 51,063. The median age was 38.1 years. 24.3% of residents were under the age of 18 and 15.0% of residents were 65 years of age or older. For every 100 females there were 93.2 males, and for every 100 females age 18 and over there were 88.8 males age 18 and over.

100.0% of residents lived in urban areas, while 0.0% lived in rural areas.

There were 16,711 households in Aspen Hill, of which 38.8% had children under the age of 18 living in them. Of all households, 52.0% were married-couple households, 14.0% were households with a male householder and no spouse or partner present, and 29.1% were households with a female householder and no spouse or partner present. About 20.1% of all households were made up of individuals and 10.2% had someone living alone who was 65 years of age or older.

There were 17,470 housing units, of which 4.3% were vacant. The homeowner vacancy rate was 0.6% and the rental vacancy rate was 6.6%.

Racial composition as of the 2020 census
Race	Number	Percent
White	16,982	33.3%
Black or African American	9,566	18.7%
American Indian and Alaska Native	541	1.1%
Asian	5,673	11.1%
Native Hawaiian and Other Pacific Islander	20	0.0%
Some other race	10,662	20.9%
Two or more races	7,619	14.9%

=== 2010 census ===
As of the census of 2010, there were 48,759 people, 16,697 households, and 11,959 families living in the community. The population density was 4,799.2 inhabitants per square mile (1,853.0/km^{2}). There were 16,697 housing units at an average density of 1,590.2 per square mile (614.0/km^{2}). The racial makeup of the area was 50.60% White, 21.70% Black or African American, 0.60% Native American, 10.9% Asian, 0.00% Pacific Islander, 11.5% from other races, and 4.6% from two or more races. 27.9% of the population were Hispanic or Latino of any race. 37.2 of the population were non-Hispanic whites and 13.4% were White Latinos. 20.9% were non-Hispanic African-Americans and less than 1% were Afro-Latino.

As of 2010, the Hispanic and Latino community in Aspen Hill was predominantly Central American, especially Salvadoran. 40% of Aspen Hill's Latino community was Salvadoran, 6% Honduran, 6% Guatemalan and 3% Nicaraguan. 8% of Latinos were of Mexican descent. Less than 2% were of Spaniard descent. 22% of Aspen Hill's Latinos were of South American descent, with 8% being Peruvian American, 4% being Colombian American, and 4% being Bolivian American. 3% of Latinos were Puerto Rican, 3% were Dominican American, 2% were Chilean American, 2% were Ecuadorian American, and 1% were Cuban American. Costa Ricans, Panamanians, Argentines, Paraguayans, Uruguayans and Venezuelans each constituted 1% or less of the Latino population.

=== 2000 census ===
As of the census of 2000, there were 50,228 people, 18,187 households, and 13,076 families living in the community. The population density was 4,799.2 inhabitants per square mile (1,853.0/km^{2}). There were 18,565 housing units at an average density of 1,773.9 per square mile (684.9/km^{2}). The racial makeup of the area was 55.60% White, 20.98% Black or African American, 0.33% Native American, 11.51% Asian, 0.06% Pacific Islander, 7.48% from other races, and 4.04% from two or more races. 15.44% of the population were Hispanic or Latino of any race. 9% of Aspen Hill's residents were Irish, 9% German, 7% English, 4% Central American, 4% Italian, 4% Subsaharan African 3% Chinese, 3% South American, 3% West Indian, 3% Korean, 3% Polish, 3% Salvadoran, 2% Russian, 2% Indian, 2% Scottish and 2% Jamaican. People of Vietnamese, Arab, Mexican, French, Greek, Filipino, Scotch-Irish, Welsh, Brazilian, Ukrainian, Peruvian, Haitian, Dutch, Bolivian, Swedish, Puerto Rican, Thai, Guatemalan, Hungarian, Colombian and French-Canadian descent each comprised 1% of the population.

There were 18,187 households, out of which 33.3% had children under the age of 18 living with them, 53.7% were married couples living together, 14.1% had a female householder with no husband present, and 28.1% were non-families. 21.9% of all households were made up of individuals, and 7.6% had someone living alone who was 65 years of age or older. The average household size was 2.74 and the average family size was 3.18.

In the area the population was spread out, with 24.0% under the age of 18, 7.7% from 18 to 24, 31.8% from 25 to 44, 24.0% from 45 to 64, and 12.5% who were 65 years of age or older. The median age was 37 years. For every 100 females, there were 89.9 males. For every 100 females age 18 and over, there were 85.7 males.

The median income for a household in the area was $63,340, and the median income for a family was $73,736 (these figures had risen to $75,014 and $81,474 respectively as of a 2007 estimate). Males had a median income of $44,341 versus $36,739 for females. The per capita income for the area was $27,905. About 4.6% of families and 6.8% of the population were below the poverty line, including 8.0% of those under age 18 and 6.4% of those age 65 or over.
