= Martinsburg station =

MARC and Amtrak rail station in Martinsburg, West Virginia, US

Martinsburg, WV
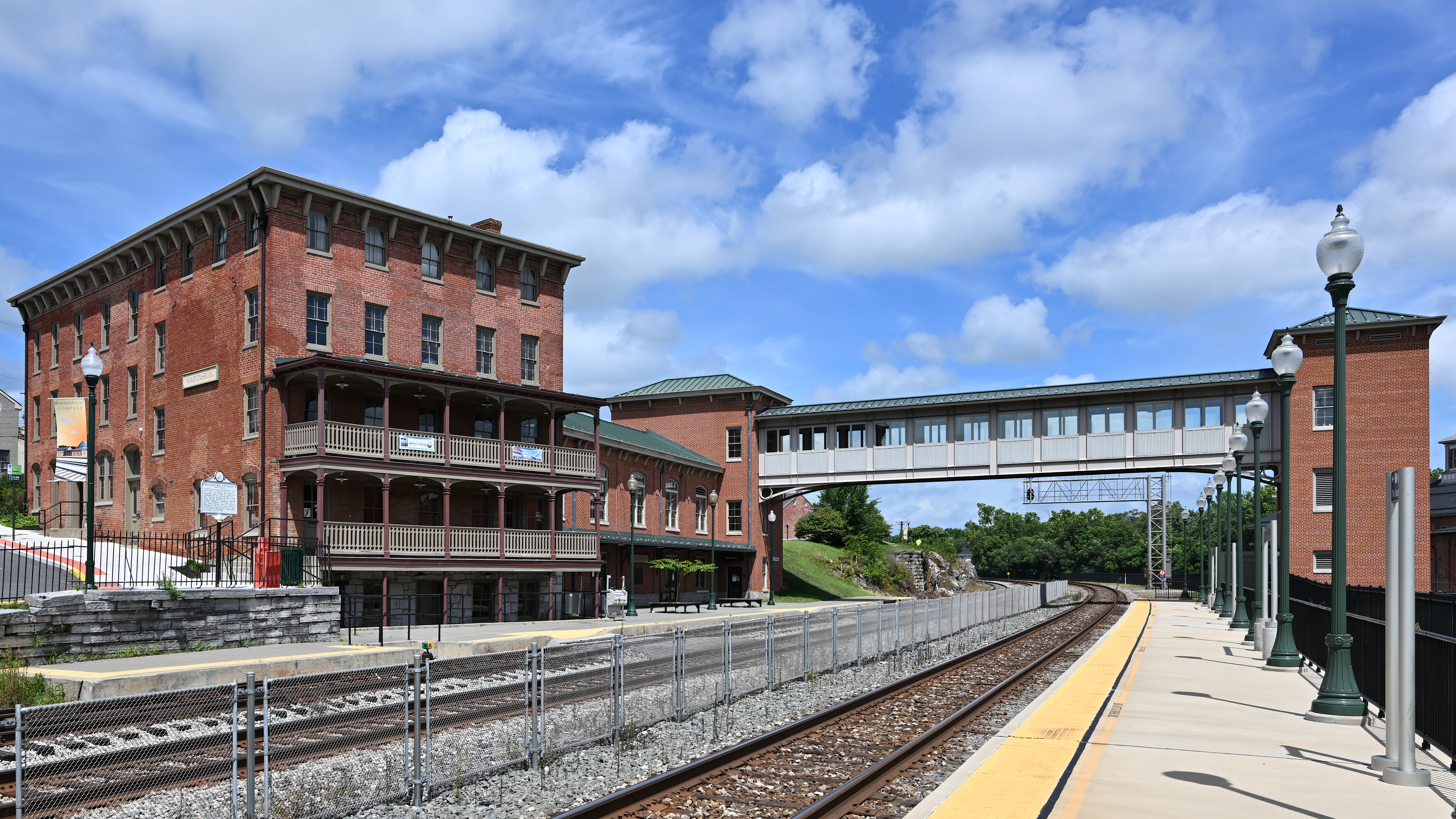
- Martinsburg station in 2022

General information
- Other names: Caperton Train station
- Location: 229 East Martin Street; Martinsburg, West Virginia; United States
- Coordinates: 39°27′31″N 77°57′38.5″W
- Owner: City of Martinsburg
- Line: CSX Cumberland Subdivision
- Platforms: 2 side platforms
- Tracks: 3
- Bus operators: Eastern Panhandle Transit Authority (EPTA)

Construction
- Parking: 81 spaces
- Accessible: No

Other information
- Station code: Amtrak: MRB

History
- Opened: 1848

Passengers
- FY 2025: 9,082 (Amtrak)
- November 2022: 61 (daily) (MARC)

Services
Preceding station	Amtrak	Following station
Cumberland toward Chicago	Floridian	Harpers Ferry toward Miami
Preceding station	MARC	Following station
Terminus	Brunswick Line	Duffields toward Union Station
Former services
Preceding station	Baltimore and Ohio Railroad	Following station
Cumberland toward Chicago	Main Line	Duffields toward Jersey City
Terminus	Main Line local service	Blairton toward Washington, D.C.
Preceding station	Amtrak	Following station
Cumberland toward Cincinnati (River Road)	Shenandoah	Duffields toward Washington, D.C.
Cumberland toward Chicago	Capitol Limited	Harpers Ferry toward Washington, D.C.
- Caperton Station Hotel
- U.S. Historic district – Contributing property
- Built: 1848
- Architectural style: Italianate
- Part of: Baltimore and Ohio and Related Industries Historic District (ID80004415)
- Added to NRHP: December 10, 1980
Location

Martinsburg station (also known as the Caperton Train station) is a railway station in Martinsburg, West Virginia, United States. It is served by MARC Brunswick Line commuter rail service and Amtrak Floridian intercity rail service. The station has one side platform serving a siding track of the CSX Cumberland Subdivision, with a footbridge crossing the siding and the two main tracks to provide access to the preserved Baltimore and Ohio Railroad Martinsburg Shops complex.

== History ==
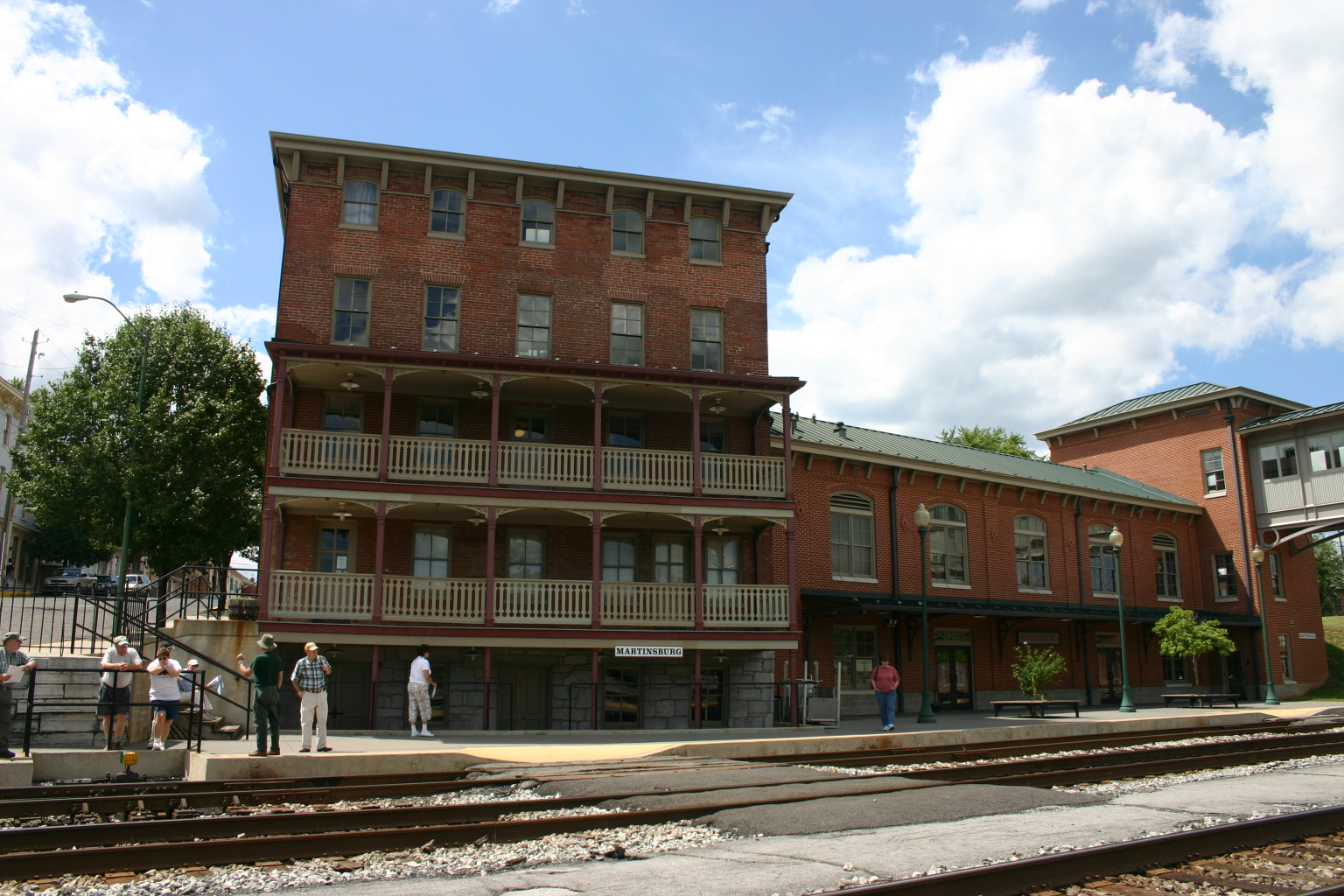
The historic hotel (left) and modern station addition in 2008

Martinsburg station consists of a restored 1848-1876 railroad hotel and its sympathetic modern train station addition. It is a contributing property to the Baltimore and Ohio and Related Industries Historic District. The building is among the oldest surviving railroad stations in the United States. The adjacent roundhouses and shops were destroyed by General Stonewall Jackson's troops in 1863. The Great Railroad Strike of 1877 began in Martinsburg.

The Martinsburg Street Railway operated between the station and the Cumberland Valley Railroad depot during its two-year operation from 1891-1893.

Amtrak took over intercity service in May 1971; no intercity service was retained on the Baltimore and Ohio Railroad (B&O) mainline. The B&O continued to provide limited commuter service, with Martinsburg the western terminus for one of the three daily round trips. Amtrak restored intercity service on the B&O on September 8, 1971, with the Parkersburg–Washington West Virginian. It was renamed Potomac Turbo on February 7, 1972, and Potomac Special on May 14, 1972.

The Potomac Special was replaced with the Cumberland–Washington Blue Ridge on May 7, 1973. The Cincinnati–Washington Shenandoah was introduced on October 31, 1976; the Blue Ridge was cut back to Martinsburg and rescheduled to act as an additional commuter train. On October 1, 1981, the Shenandoah was replaced with the Chicago–Washington Capitol Limited. The Blue Ridge was transferred to MARC in 1986, becoming part of the ex-B&O Brunswick Line commuter service. Maryland began to fund the B&O in 1974. The next year, B&O service operated as a shuttle between Martinsburg and Brunswick; stopping at the three stations in West Virginia. On November 10, 2024, the Capitol Limited was merged with the Silver Star as the Floridian.

The Eastern Panhandle Transit Authority plans to relocate much of its bus service from Martinsburg station to a new transit center.
