= Harpers Ferry station =

Railway station in West Virginia, US

Harpers Ferry, WV
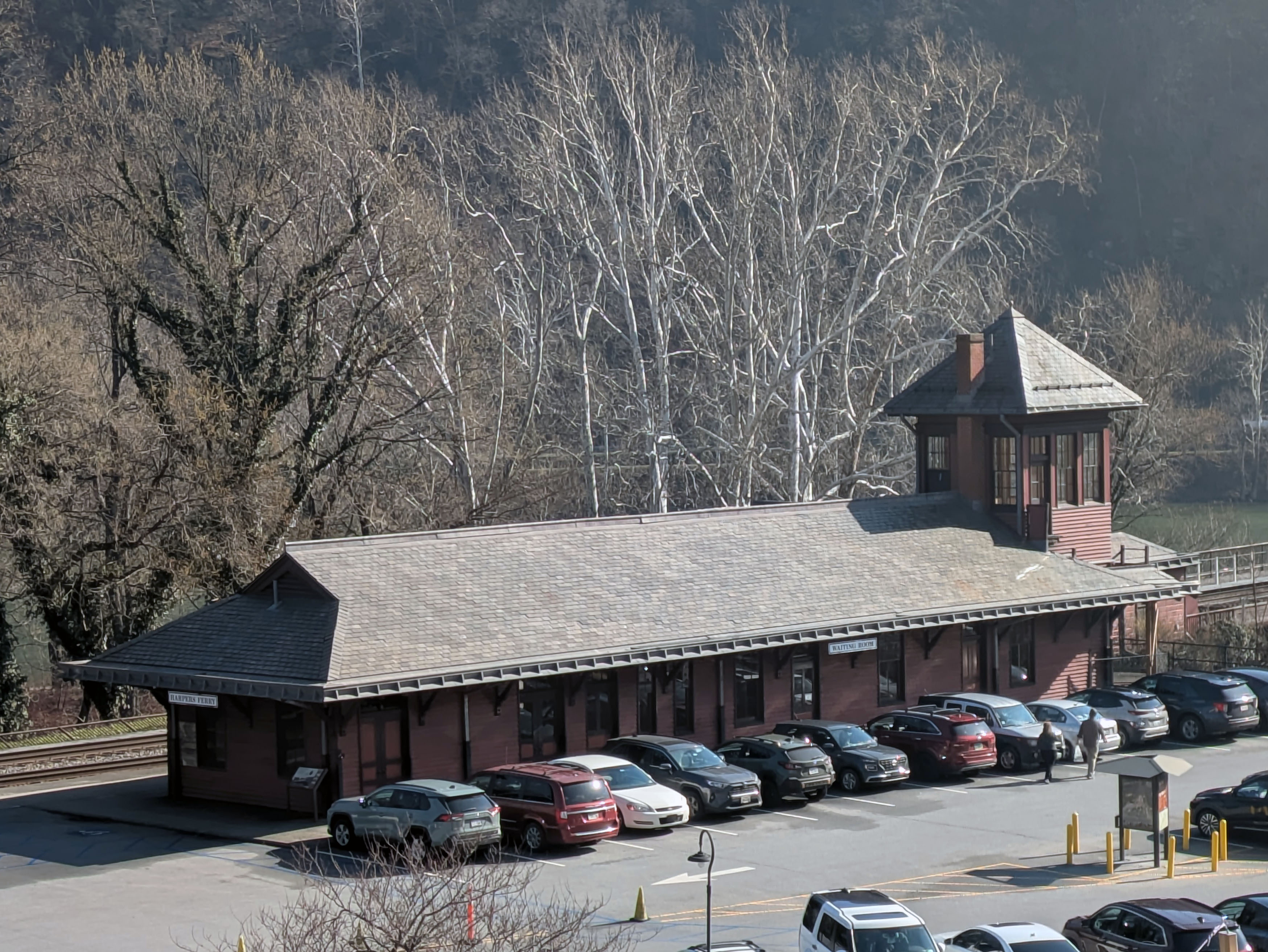
- Harpers Ferry station in 2026

General information
- Location: 120 Potomac Street; Harpers Ferry, West Virginia; United States
- Owner: National Park Service
- Line: CSX Cumberland Subdivision
- Platforms: 2 side platforms
- Tracks: 2
- Bus routes: EPTA bus: Route 20, MARC-H

Construction
- Parking: 98 spaces
- Accessible: No

Other information
- Station code: Amtrak: HFY

History
- Opened: 1837
- Rebuilt: 1894

Passengers
- FY 2025: 8,427 (Amtrak)
- November 2022: 18 (daily) (MARC)

Services
Preceding station	Amtrak	Following station
Martinsburg toward Chicago	Floridian	Rockville toward Miami
Preceding station	MARC	Following station
Duffields toward Martinsburg	Brunswick Line	Brunswick toward Union Station
Former services
Preceding station	Amtrak	Following station
Martinsburg Terminus	Blue Ridge ended 1986	Brunswick toward Washington, D.C.
Duffields toward Cincinnati (River Road)	Shenandoah ended 1981	Brunswick toward Washington, D.C.
Martinsburg toward Chicago	Capitol Limited ended 2024	Rockville toward Washington, D.C.
Preceding station	Baltimore and Ohio Railroad	Following station
Duffields toward Chicago	Main Line	Brunswick toward Jersey City
Engle toward Martinsburg	Main Line local service	Sandy Hook toward Washington, D.C.
Millville toward Strasburg	Shenandoah Valley Branch	Terminus
- Harpers Ferry Train Station
- U.S. Historic district – Contributing property
- Coordinates: 39°19′28″N 77°43′52″W
- Architect: E. Francis Baldwin
- Part of: Harpers Ferry Historic District (ID79002584)
- Added to NRHP: 1979
Location

Harpers Ferry station is a railway station in Harpers Ferry, West Virginia. It is served by the Amtrak Floridian intercity service as well as the MARC Brunswick Line commuter service. The station is listed on the National Register of Historic Places as part of the Harpers Ferry Historic District. It has two side platforms serving the two tracks of the CSX Cumberland Subdivision. The station is not accessible.

== History ==
=== Early history ===
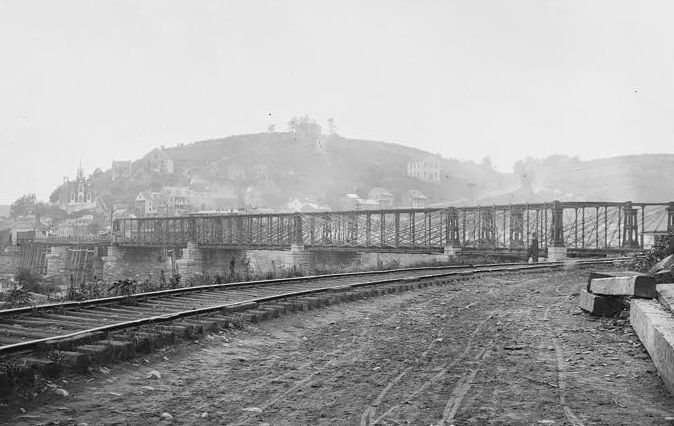
The original bridge in the 1860s

The Baltimore and Ohio Railroad (B&O) began building westward from Baltimore in 1828 and reached Point of Rocks in 1832. It was planned to continue westward along the north bank of the Potomac River to Cumberland, Maryland, which conflicted with the competing Chesapeake and Ohio Canal. A 1833 decision by the Maryland state legislature prevented the B&O from using its planned north bank route west of Harpers Ferry. The railroad decided to cross the Potomac into West Virginia at Harpers Ferry to connect with the under-construction Winchester and Potomac Railroad (W&P). The B&O line was completed to a point across from Harpers Ferry on December 1, 1834.

The B&O replaced the existing turnpike bridge with a new single-track bridge. It had a sharp curve on the north end, since the line had to wrap around Maryland Heights, and aligned with the W&P on the south end. The B&O built a small ticket office measuring 20 by 30 feet (6.1 m × 9.1 m) in Harpers Ferry. Service on the W&P and the new bridge began in 1837. The B&O intended to follow the W&P to Charles Town, West Virginia, before turning westward but the W&P refused to grant trackage rights. Instead, the B&O line followed a narrow right-of-way along the edge of the Harpers Ferry Armory, which required a second tight curve at the south end of the bridge. Construction began in 1839 and reached Cumberland in late 1842. The B&O and the W&P built separate freight houses in Harpers Ferry around 1846. The B&O leased the W&P in 1867 as its Valley Branch.

=== 1894 bridge and station ===
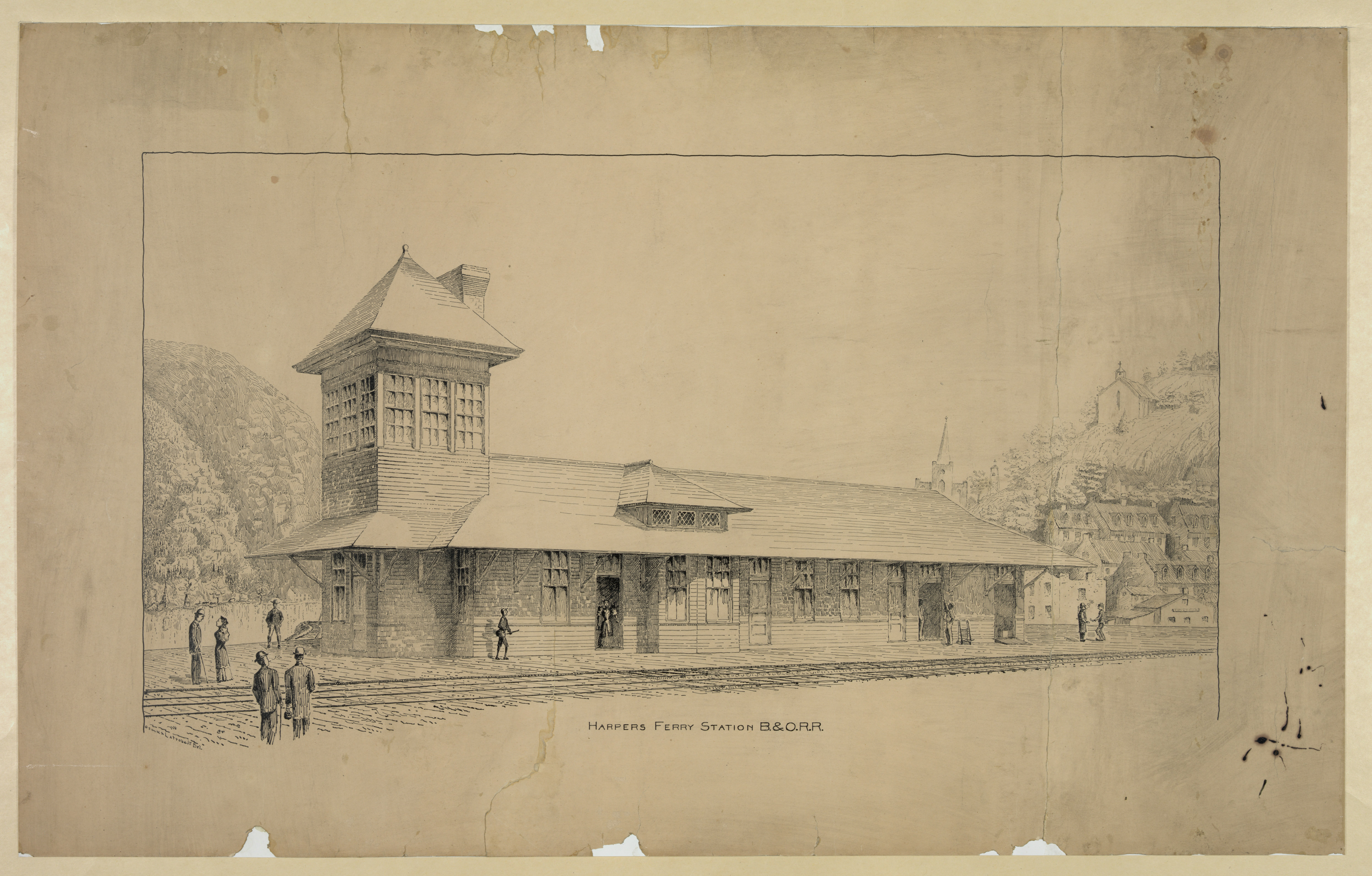
Drawing of the 1894-built station

The railroad bridge was destroyed during the Civil War and rebuilt on the same piers. Despite a growing recognition that the outdated bridge and sharp curves were an impediment to operations, the B&O did not begin work on a replacement until 1892. A tunnel was bored through Maryland Heights, allowing a new double-track bridge to be built with gentler curves. The tracks through Harpers Ferry were realigned further inland across the former armory site. The B&O constructed a new station at the junction between the relocated main line and the W&P, replacing an older passenger station. It was a 101-by-21-foot (30.8 m × 6.4 m) one-story wooden structure with a two-story tower at one end. It opened in fall 1894. The station was designed by E. Francis Baldwin, who was the architect for a number of B&O stations in that era.

The B&O added a three-sided wooden shelter on the north (westbound) platform in October 1898. It was enlarged in 1910, with part of the structure fully enclosed. Poor sightlines on the curve and busy train traffic resulted in passengers being fatally struck by trains. In 1913, the B&O constructed a pedestrian tunnel ('subway') connecting the station building and the shelter. It was part of a larger set of safety improvements to the line between Harpers Ferry and Brunswick, Maryland. The B&O drew up plans in 1913 for a new brick station at Harpers Ferry but did not construct it.

=== 1931 bridge and relocation ===
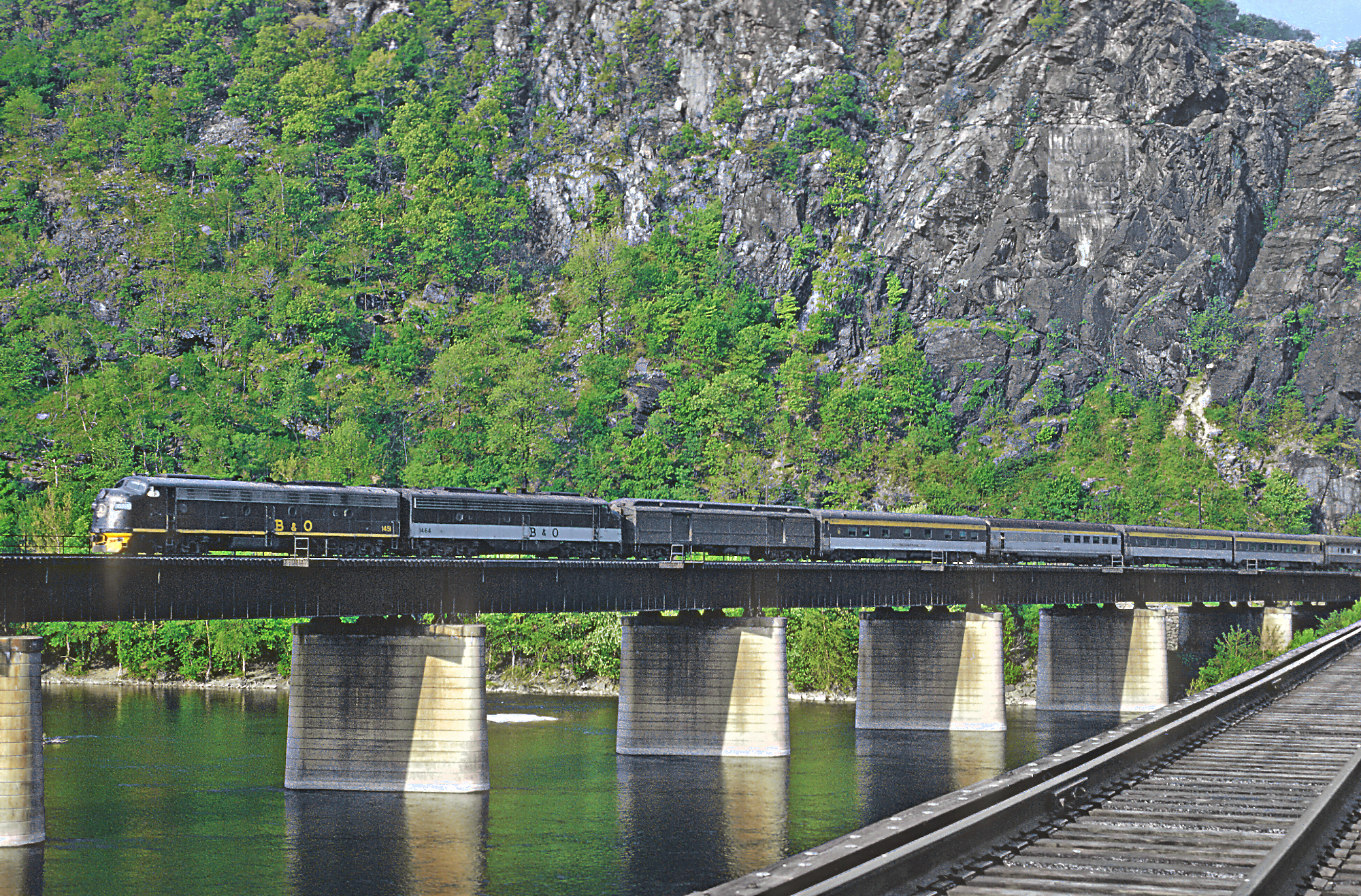
The Capitol Limited approaching Harpers Ferry on the 1931-built bridge in 1969

By the 1920s, even the gentler curves of the 1894-built bridge were an impediment for heavier and faster freight trains. In 1930–31, the B&O built a new double-track bridge upstream from the existing bridge. The tracks on the West Virginia side were again realigned, with curvature decreased from nine degrees to four degrees. The westbound shelter was moved to the new alignment in February 1931; it connected to a new passenger subway. The interior of the station building was renovated in 1931, with a boiler room replacing the former women's waiting room. The building was relocated on April 15, 1931. It was connected to the south end of the subway with a new section of new roof.

Passenger service declined in the 1930s, rose sharply during World War II, and declined again in the postwar years. Valley Branch service dwindled to a single daily round trip, which was discontinued on August 13, 1949. By then, Harpers Ferry was served by seven eastbound and five westbound of the twelve daily round trips that passed through on the mainline. The Washington–Pittsburgh–Chicago Express, Metropolitan Special, Ambassador, and Washingtonian stopped in both directions. The eastbound Diplomat, Shenandoah, and West Virginian and the westbound Cleveland Night Express also stopped, but their opposite-direction counterparts did not. The National Limited, Capitol Limited, Columbian, and Cincinnatian did not stop. The interlocking tower that protruded from the station was retired in February 1950 and removed within a year.

Passenger service continued to decline over the following two decades. The B&O merged with the Chesapeake and Ohio Railway (C&O) in 1963. By 1964, the station was served by all five daily round trips on the B&O mainline: the National Limited, Capitol Limited, Shenandoah, Washington–Chicago Express, and the unnamed ex-Metropolitan Special. By late 1970, daily intercity service consisted of the Capitol Limited, Shenandoah, and Metropolitan, the latter two of which were combined westbound. Harpers Ferry was also served by a daily Cumberland–Washington round trip, a daily westbound train to Cumberland, and a weekday-only Martinsburg–Washington round trip, for a total of five weekday and four weekend round trips. In 1974, the state of Maryland began to fund the B&O. The next year, B&O service operated as a shuttle between Martinsburg and Brunswick; stopping at the three stations in West Virginia.

=== Amtrak and MARC ===
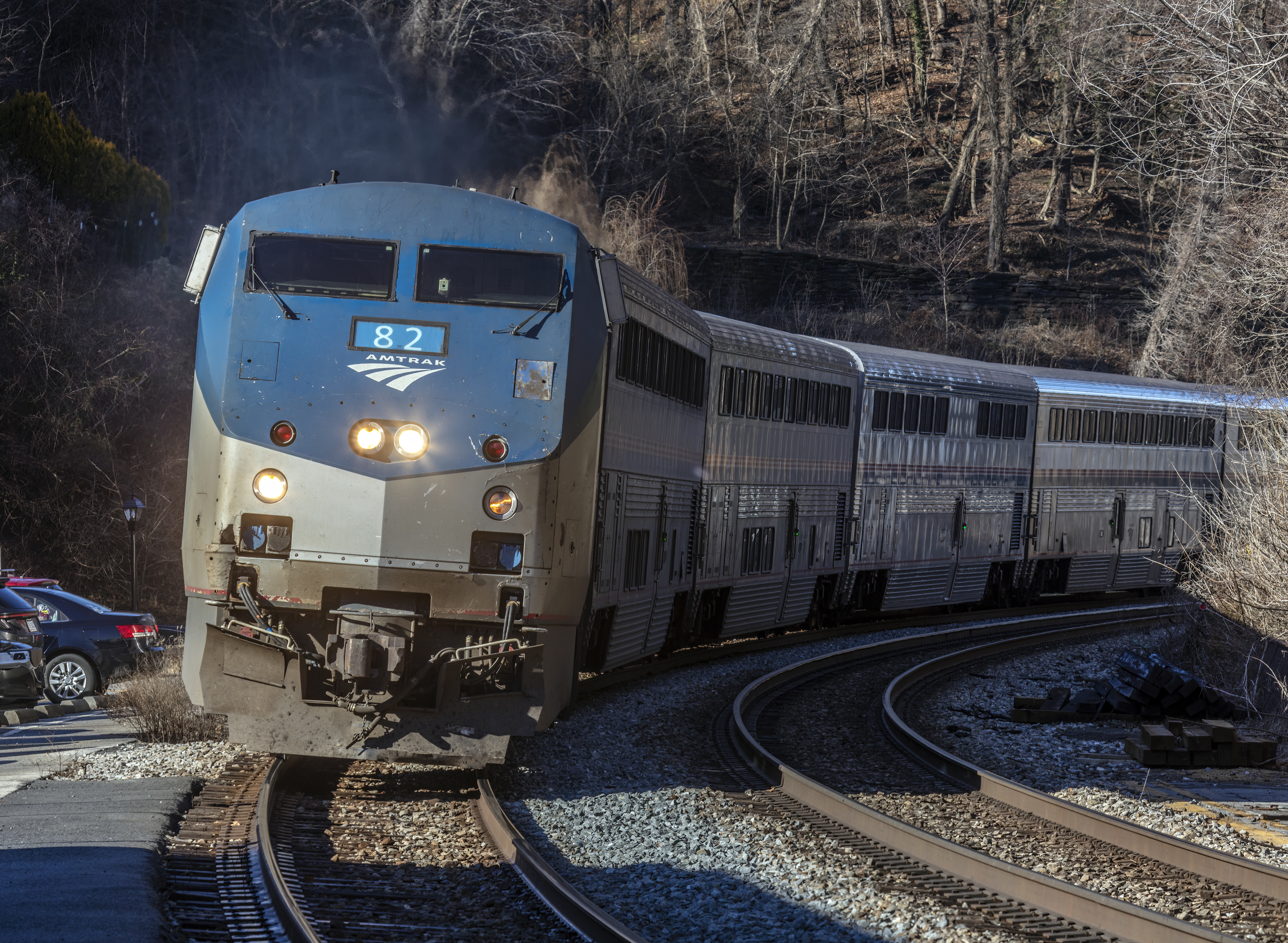
The Capitol Limited at Harpers Ferry in 2023

Amtrak took over intercity passenger rail service in the United States on May 1, 1971. The intercity trains and the Cumberland trains were dropped, leaving Harpers Ferry with only the Martinsburg round trip.

The station was listed on the National Register of Historic Places on October 14, 1979, as part of the Harpers Ferry Historic District.

CSX Corporation became the station's owner in 1987, when the company acquired C&O. In 2001, the National Park Service acquired the station and the nearby land that once held the Harpers Ferry Armory, as part of a land swap.

In 2007, the station was rededicated following a $2.2 million renovation, which included restoration of the station's tower.

On November 10, 2024, the Capitol Limited was merged with the Silver Star as the Floridian.
