= Duffields station =

Rail station in Duffields, West Virginia, US

Duffields
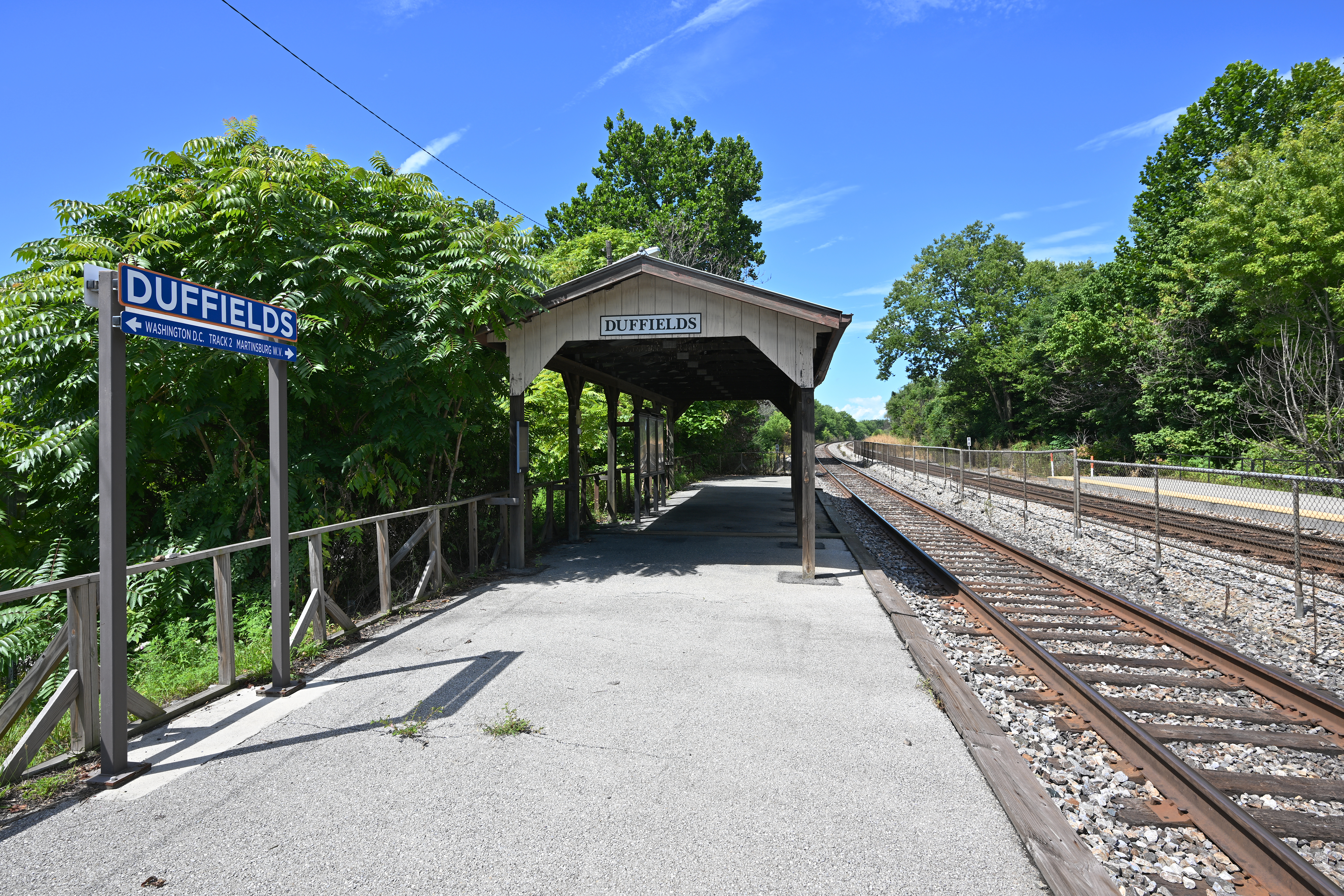
- Duffields station in August 2022

General information
- Location: 5057 Flowing Springs Road; Duffields, West Virginia
- Coordinates: 39.3621°N 77.8281°W
- Line: CSX Cumberland Subdivision
- Platforms: 2 side platforms
- Tracks: 2
- Bus routes: Eastern Panhandle Transit Authority: MARC-H

Construction
- Parking: 295 spaces
- Accessible: No

History
- Opened: 1842
- Rebuilt: 1883–1884, 1986

Passengers
- November 2022: 62 daily

Services
Preceding station	MARC	Following station
Martinsburg Terminus	Brunswick Line	Harpers Ferry toward Union Station
Former services
Preceding station	Amtrak	Following station
Martinsburg toward Cincinnati (River Road)	Shenandoah 1979–1981	Harpers Ferry One-way operation
Preceding station	Baltimore and Ohio Railroad	Following station
Martinsburg toward Chicago	Main Line	Harpers Ferry toward Jersey City
Shenandoah Junction toward Martinsburg	Main Line local service	Engle toward Washington, D.C.
- Duffields Depot
- U.S. National Register of Historic Places
- Location: 45 Melvin Road; Duffields, West Virginia
- Coordinates: 39.3627°N 77.8256°W
- Built: c. 1839–1843 (Note: National Register of Historic Places documentation lists the structure as being built in 1839. Other sources indicate 1839, 1842 or 1843. Duffield wrote in a December 1841 advertisement that "A depot for produce is about to be established...")
- NRHP reference No.: 07000780
- Added to NRHP: August 3, 2007
Location

Duffields station is a MARC train station in Duffields, West Virginia, served by the Brunswick Line. The station has two side platforms flanking the Cumberland Subdivision, though only one is normally used. The Baltimore and Ohio Railroad (B&O) began passenger and freight service at Duffields in 1842. The original privately owned station building, which had wood and stone halves, was constructed between 1839 and 1843. The depot and its environs were a significant focus of activity during the American Civil War, culminating in the "Greenback Raid" of 1864.

A B&O-owned station replaced the first station building in 1883–1884; that later building was demolished around 1942. Duffields was briefly served by the Amtrak Shenandoah from 1979 to 1981. B&O local service became part of MARC in 1984; a new shelter was constructed in 1986. The original station building was listed on the National Register of Historic Places in 2007 as Duffields Depot. The wooden section collapsed in 2018, while the stone section has been partially renovated.

== Station design ==
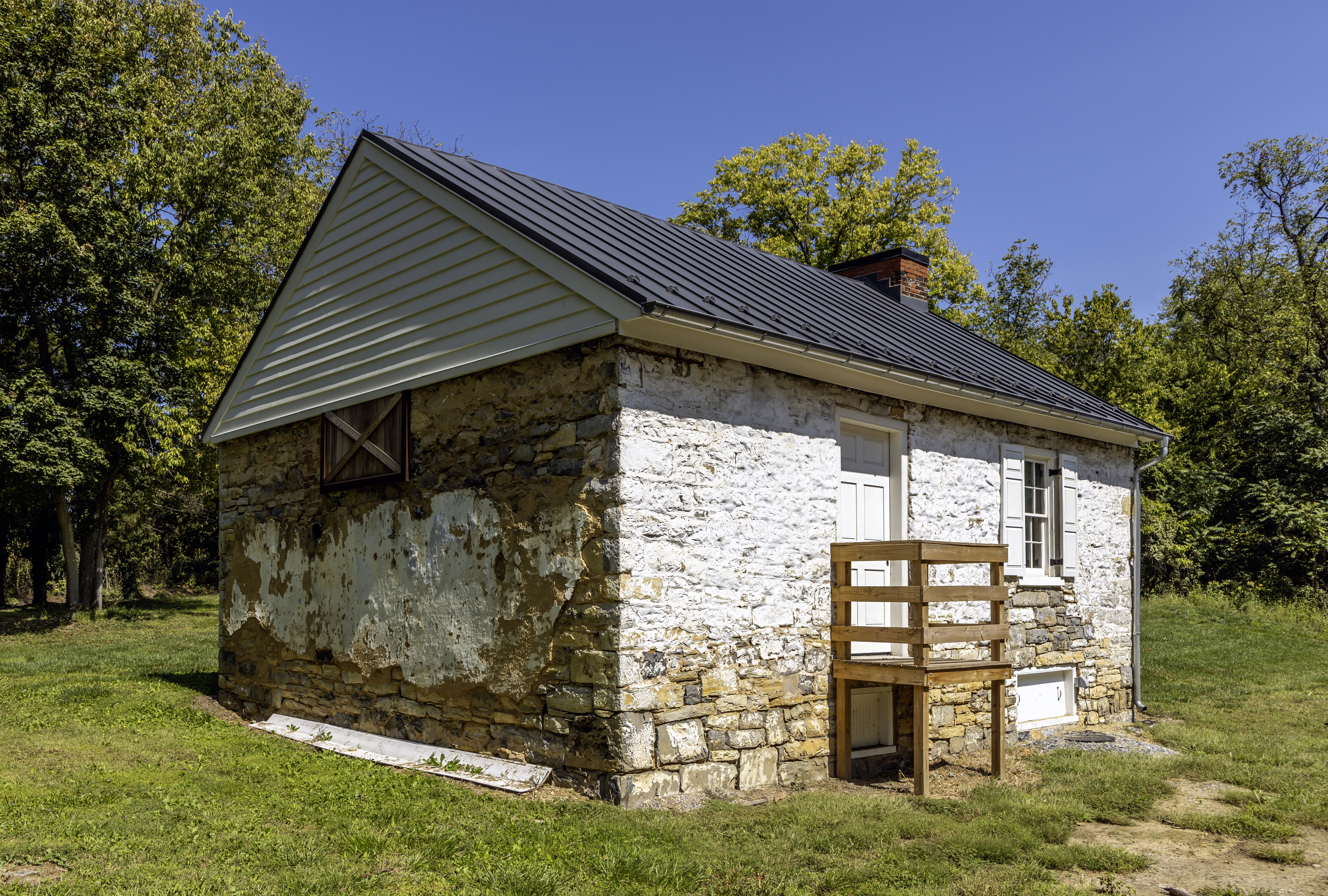
The first station building in 2024

Duffields station is located on the west side of Flowing Springs Road in unincorporated Duffields in Jefferson County, West Virginia. It is on the two-track Cumberland Subdivision of CSX Transportation. MARC trains normally use the southern track, Track 2, which has a side platform with a wooden shelter; however, a platform on Track 1 can be used if needed. The platforms are about 200 feet (60 m) long and are not accessible. A 295-space parking lot is located on the south side of the tracks. The West Virginia State Rail Authority owns the parking lot, while CSX owns the platforms and tracks.

The historic station building is located on the north side of the tracks east of Flowing Springs Road. It is a 1 1/2-story structure originally formed of two sections. The eastern stone section served as the station master's house and passenger station, while the western wood section was a freight house. The wooden portion is no longer extant. The building measured 50 by 24 feet (15.2 m × 7.3 m), of which the remaining stone section is 30 by 24 feet (9.1 m × 7.3 m).

The eastern section was built from rough local limestone with 18-inch (46 cm)-thick walls. It was built into a slope in the manner of a bank barn, with the main level on the same grade as Melvin Road and the basement at track level. It had two fireplaces with a chimney at the east end. The first floor was divided into two rooms; the well-finished south room served as the waiting room, while the north room likely served as an office and ticket window. The station master's quarters were in the attic. The western section was built of sawn timbers with clapboard siding. It shared the gabled roofline of the stone section, but had no basement. The first floor was divided into three rooms; the attic had two rooms.

== History ==
=== Original station ===
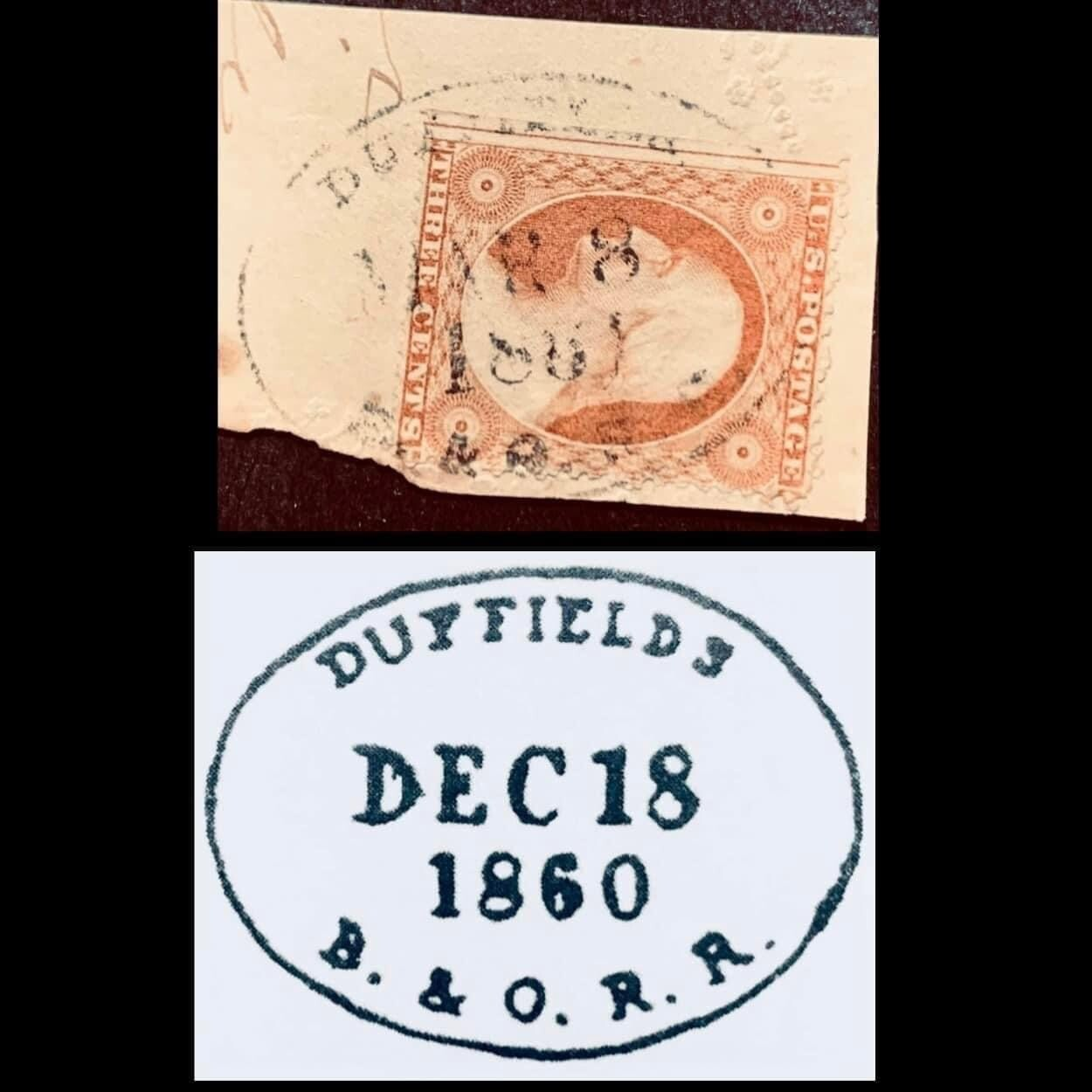
Postage cancelled at Duffields in 1860

The Baltimore and Ohio Railroad (B&O) opened its first section west from Baltimore to Point of Rocks, Maryland, in 1832. It reached a point across from Harpers Ferry, Virginia (Note: West Virginia separated from Virginia in 1863.) in 1834, and a bridge opened over the Potomac River to Harpers Ferry in 1837. Extension further west was stymied by an 1833 court decision that prevented the railroad from using its original planned route on the north bank of the Potomac River. The railroad later planned to use a portion of the Winchester and Potomac Railroad and turn northwest at Charles Town, but failed to reach an agreement.

In 1838, the B&O settled on a route that followed the Elk Run and Elk Branch valleys west from Harpers Ferry. An 1838 Virginia state law disallowed the B&O from opening any freight stations of its own between Harpers Ferry and the Shepherdstown Pike, though it was allowed to contract with landowners to open private stations. This was revised in 1839 to allow a railroad-owned station on Richard Duffield's land near the Shepherdstown county road (now Flowing Springs Road), but no other such stations between Harpers Ferry and Martinsburg.

Construction west from Harpers Ferry began in 1839. The B&O paid Duffield $2,500 (equivalent to $76,000 in 2025) for a portion of his land to construct the railroad. Duffield used the money to build a station; despite the law it was owned by him rather than by the B&O. The railroad preferred to use existing structures as depots, or to contract with landowners to build them, rather than spending limited funds. A water tank for steam locomotives and a grain elevator were later located nearby.

The Harpers Ferry–Martinsburg portion of the line opened on May 21, 1842. Duffields station served both freight and passengers by the end of the year. Duffield's son Alfred was the first stationmaster; he also served as the postmaster for Duffields from 1843 to 1845. James Hunter bought the depot in 1855 after Richard Duffield's death. Hunter also served as stationmaster and postmaster. John Hillary served those roles from 1862 to 1866.

During the American Civil War, the B&O was a frequent target of Confederate raids aiming to disrupt Union supply lines. Duffields station served as a military supply point; it was guarded by Union forces. John S. Mosby's 43rd Battalion Virginia Cavalry briefly captured the depot on June 29, 1864, taking 50 prisoners. On October 14, 1864, in what became known as the "Greenback Raid", Mosby's rangers cut the tracks and derailed a train just west of Duffields. They captured 15 horses and 20 prisoners, including two paymasters with $150,000 in federal cash.

=== Later stations ===
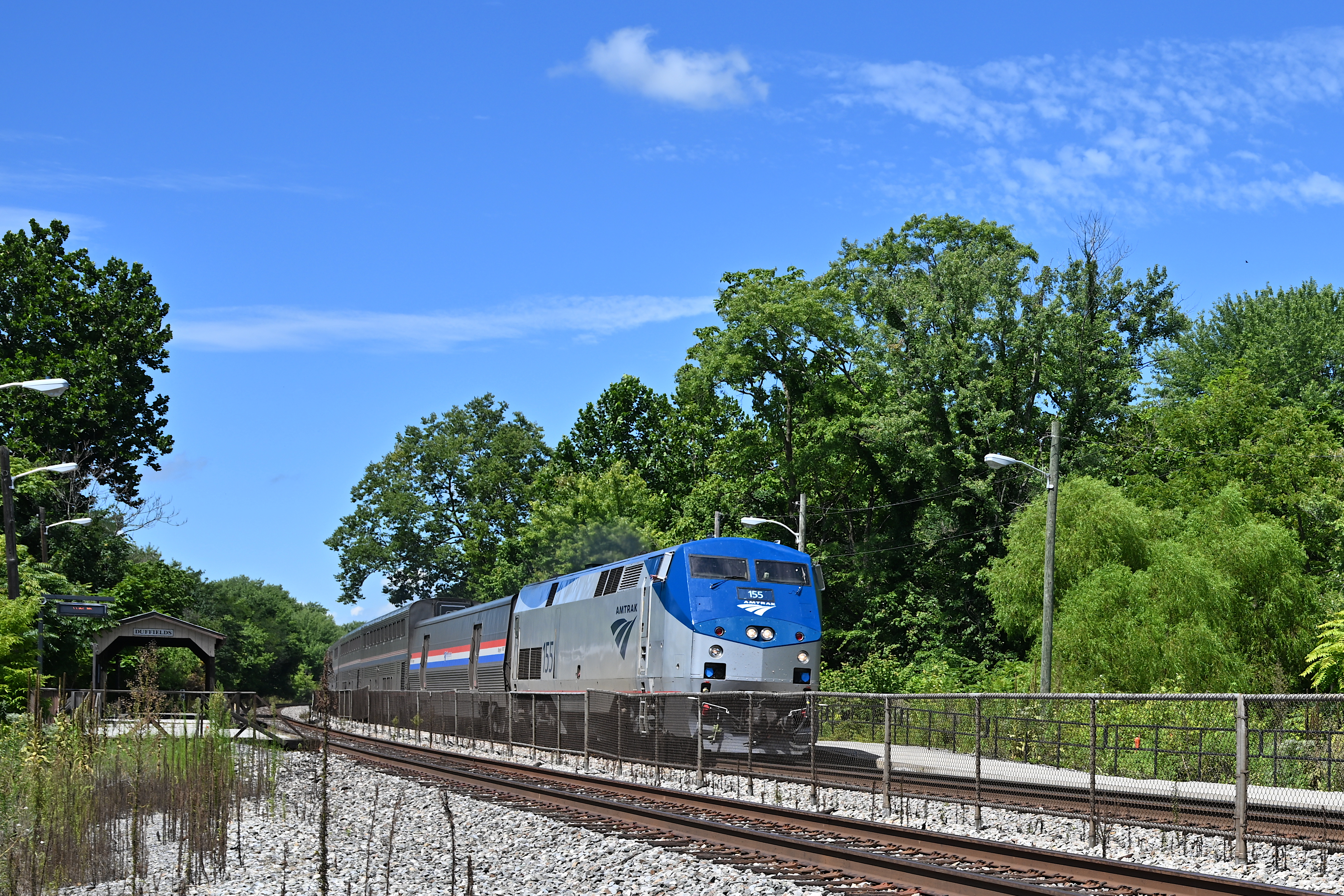
The Capitol Limited passing through the station in 2022

After the war, the B&O constructed its own station buildings, many designed by E. Francis Baldwin. A Victorian style station was constructed at Duffields in 1883 or 1884. It was located on the south side of the tracks west of Flowing Springs Road. A shed and an outhouse were built next to the original station in the 1930s. The outhouse was a standard Works Progress Administration design. The older station building was intermittently used as a residence. The 1880s station building was demolished around 1942; Duffields became a flag stop. Passenger service dwindled during the mid-20th century; by late 1970, Duffields was served only by a weekday-only Martinsburg–Washington round trip.

Amtrak took over most intercity rail service in the US on May 1, 1971; no intercity service was retained on the B&O. However, the B&O continued to run the Martinsburg round trip. Amtrak began operating the Washington–Parkersburg West Virginian in September 1971; neither it nor its successors Potomac Turbo, Potomac Special, and Blue Ridge stopped at Duffields. In October 1976, Amtrak added the Washington–Cincinnati Shenandoah, with the Blue Ridge cut back to Martinsburg. On November 26, 1979, Duffields was added as a flag stop for the westbound Shenandoah. Amtrak discontinued the Shenandoah on September 30, 1981. The Capitol Limited, which took over the eastern portion of the route, did not stop at Duffields.

The state of Maryland began funding B&O commuter service in 1974; around 1975, the West Virginia portion was reduced to a Martinsburg–Brunswick shuttle train. West Virginia began subsidizing its portion in the late 1970s; through service was restored to Martinsburg. In 1984, the Maryland State Railroad Administration began branding its three commuter rail services as MARC, with the Washington–Brunswick–Martinburg service becoming the Brunswick Line. In 1986, MARC added a wooden shelter and a park and ride lot at Duffields. That year, the Blue Ridge was merged into MARC service. Weekday Martinsburg service was two eastbound and three westbound trips.

A 2011 regional study proposed to replace Duffields station with a new station called "Northport". The new station was to be located off West Virginia Route 9 about 2.8 miles (4.5 km) to the west of Duffields in the then-proposed Jefferson Orchards mixed-use development. (Note: Although part of Ranson due to a shoestring annexation, the property was located away from the city center and closer to unincorporated Kearneysville.) The West Virginia State Rail Authority supported the plan in 2013. A study of the NorthPort station was completed in 2015. It called for two 400-foot (120 m)-long side platforms and a footbridge with an integrated station building. Construction cost was estimated at $11.1–14.3 million (equivalent to $15.1–19.4 million in 2025). However, the mixed-use development did not proceed because of uncertainty about continued operations funding for MARC service. A Rockwool International factory opened on part of the property in 2021.

=== Preservation ===
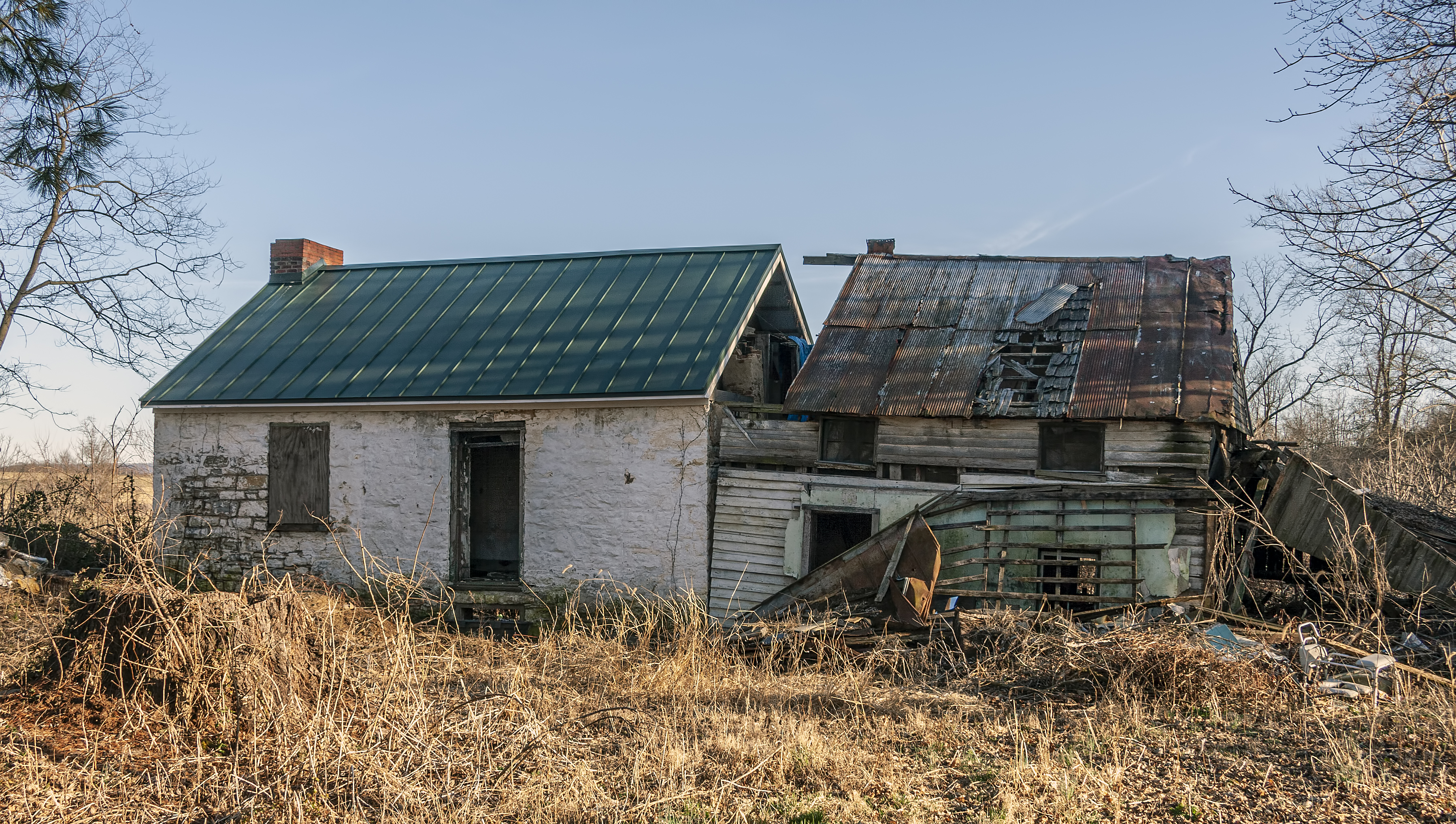
The first station building in 2012

The first station building passed through a series of private owners; it was never owned by the B&O or its successors. A non-profit organization, Duffields Station Inc., was formed in 2003 and acquired the building in January 2007 with funds from a local construction company. The organization aimed to restore the building for use as a museum. It was listed on the National Register of Historic Places on August 3, 2007, as the Duffields Depot. It was believed to be the second-oldest surviving B&O depot; only the 1829–1830 Ellicott City station in Ellicott City, Maryland, was known to be older.

By that time, the structure was in poor condition, particularly the wood portion. Some roof panels were missing, interior plaster was separated from the walls, and window sashes and interior doors were missing. The basement was filled with silt to within 2 feet (0.6 m) of the first floor joists. However, much of the original building materials and trim details were still extant. In 2008, the non-profit installed a new roof on the stone section and performed stabilization work. The $17,100 project (equivalent to $26,000 in 2025) was funded by the state and by local donations.

In February 2018, ownership of the station building was transferred to the Jefferson County Historic Landmarks Commission. The wooden section collapsed around that time and was removed. A new roof was again installed on the stone section in 2021. The commission planned to further restore the stone building for use as a museum.
