= Frederick Branch =

Frederick Branch is the name of:

- Frederick C. Branch (1922–2005), first African American officer in the United States Marine Corps

Frederick Branch may also refer to the following rail lines:

- Frederick Branch (Baltimore and Ohio Railroad)
- Frederick Branch (Pennsylvania Railroad)
