= Monocacy station =

MARC rail station in Frederick County, Maryland, US

Monocacy
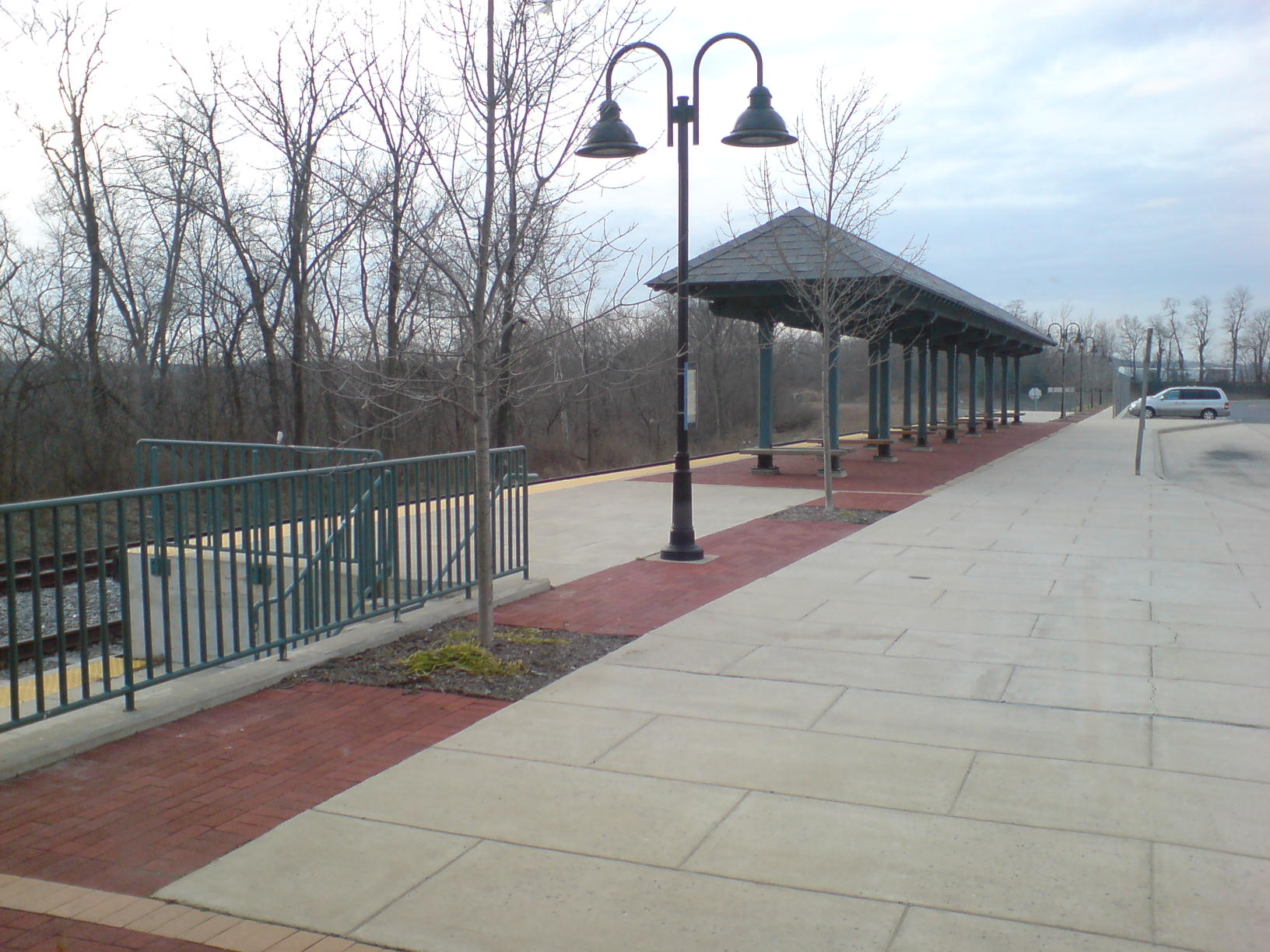
- Monocacy station in 2007

General information
- Location: 7800 Genstar Drive; Frederick, Maryland
- Coordinates: 39.3820°N 77.3947°W
- Line: Frederick Branch
- Platforms: 1 side platform
- Tracks: 2
- Connections: MTA Maryland Bus: 505, 515; TransIT Services of Frederick: 20

Construction
- Parking: Yes
- Accessible: Yes

History
- Opened: December 17, 2001

Passengers
- November 2022: 92 (daily) (MARC)

Services
| Preceding station | MARC | Following station |
|---|---|---|
| Frederick Terminus | Brunswick Line | Dickerson toward Union Station |
Location

Monocacy station (/məˈnɒkəsi/) is a MARC train station in southern Frederick, Maryland, served by the Frederick Branch of the Brunswick Line. The station is located at 7800 Genstar Drive, a cul-de-sac with a large parking lot off the east side of Maryland Route 355 in Frederick.

== History ==
Monocacy station, served at the time by the Baltimore and Ohio Railroad, played a brief but key role during John Brown's 1859 raid on the Federal Armory in nearby Harpers Ferry, Virginia (since 1863, West Virginia). Because John Brown's rebels cut the Railroad's telegraph line, no news of the rebellion reached Baltimore, the Railroad's center of operations, for several hours. The one train Brown eventually let proceed through Harpers Ferry and over the B & O Railroad Potomac River Crossing into Maryland stopped at Monocacy, which was the next station with staff and a telegraph, something not available in the stations at the hamlets of Sandy Hook, Maryland, and Point of Rocks, Maryland. The conductor stopped the train and sent a message about the abolitionist rebellion to B&O headquarters. After confirming it, the Railroad notified President James Buchanan, Virginia Governor Henry A. Wise, and other officials about the raid/revolt, beginning the operation to suppress it.

The modern station opened on December 17, 2001. The architects of Cochran, Stephenson & Donkervoet, Inc. designed the small station to resemble B&O stations from the past.
