= Harpers Ferry Historic District =

Historic district in West Virginia, United States

- U.S. National Register of Historic Places
- U.S. Historic district
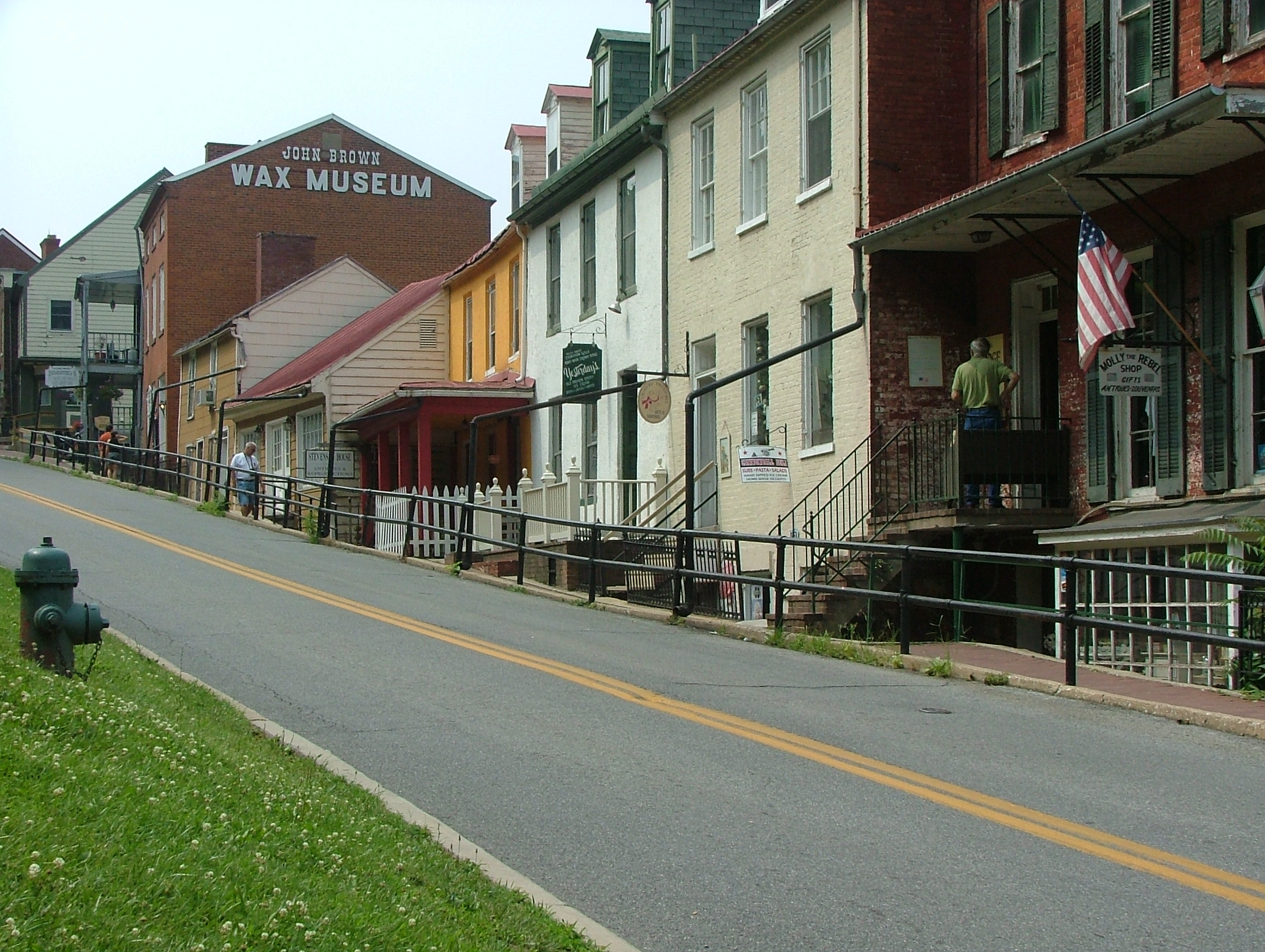

- Location within West Virginia
- Location: Harpers Ferry, West Virginia
- Coordinates: 39°19′35″N 77°44′29″W
- Built: 1800
- Architect: Multiple
- Architectural style: Late Victorian
- NRHP reference No.: 79002584
- Added to NRHP: October 15, 1979

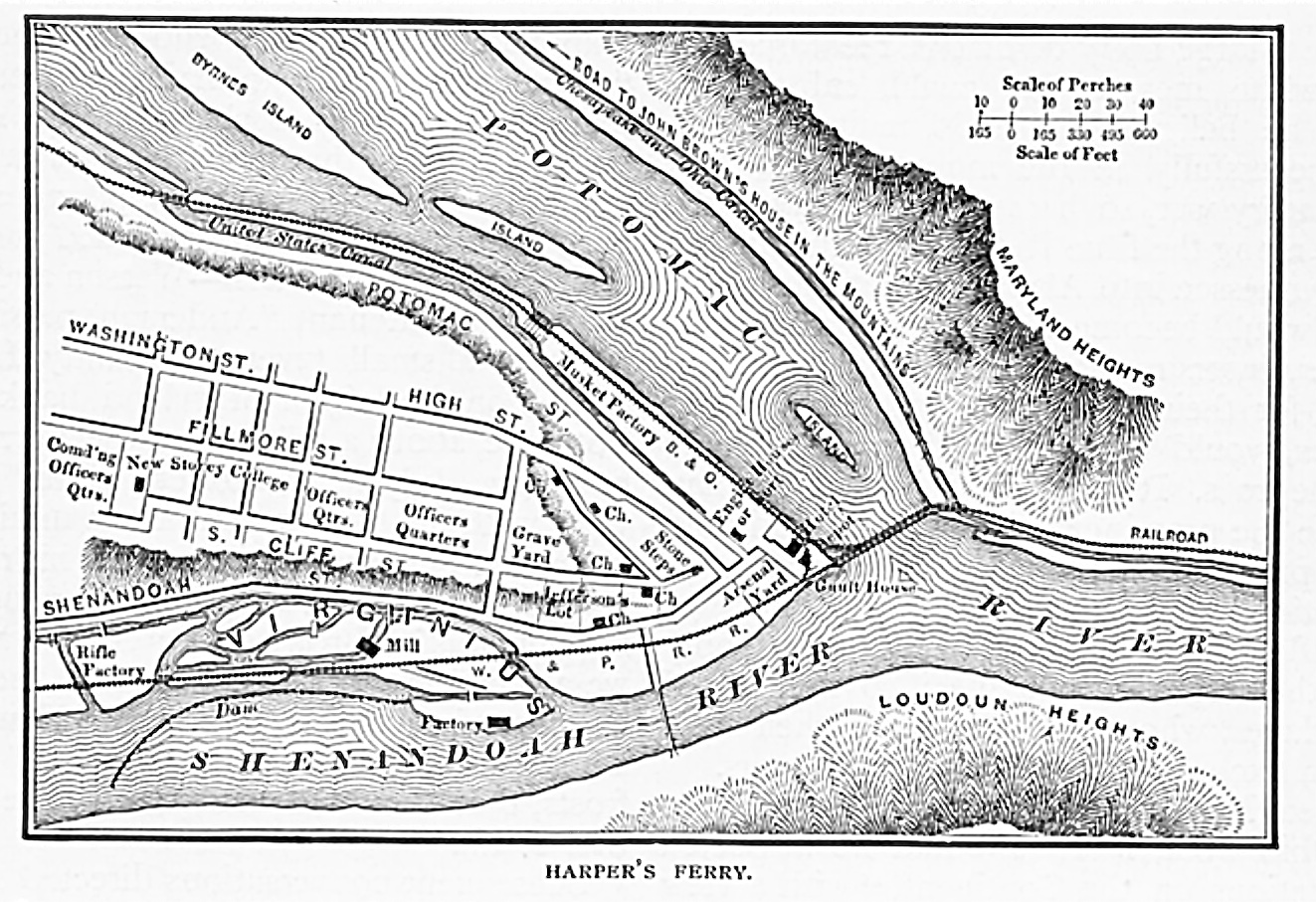
Map of Harper's Ferry in 1859, the year of John Brown's raid. "W&PRR" is the Winchester and Potomac Railroad, which ran beside the Shenandoah. The Baltimore & Ohio Railroad, which ran and still runs along the Potomac, is shown but not labeled. The train station and hotel were at the intersection of the two lines.

The Harpers Ferry Historic District comprises about one hundred historic structures in Harpers Ferry, West Virginia. The historic district includes the portions of the central town not included in Harpers Ferry National Historical Park, including large numbers of early 19th-century houses built by the United States Government for the workers at the Harpers Ferry Armory. Significant buildings and sites include the site of the Armory, the U.S Armory Potomac Canal, the Harpers Ferry Train Station, and Shenandoah Street, Potomac Street, and High or Washington Street. The National Historic Park essentially comprises the lower, flood-prone areas of the town, while the Historic District comprises the upper town.

In the late 19th century a number of Victorian and Federalist-style houses were built on the high ground and received guests who included Mark Twain, Alexander Graham Bell and Woodrow Wilson. "Stonewall" Jackson also made the town his base of command during part of the Civil War and Thomas Jefferson said of the ferry area that: "The passage of the Patowmac through the Blue Ridge is perhaps one of the most stupendous scenes in Nature."

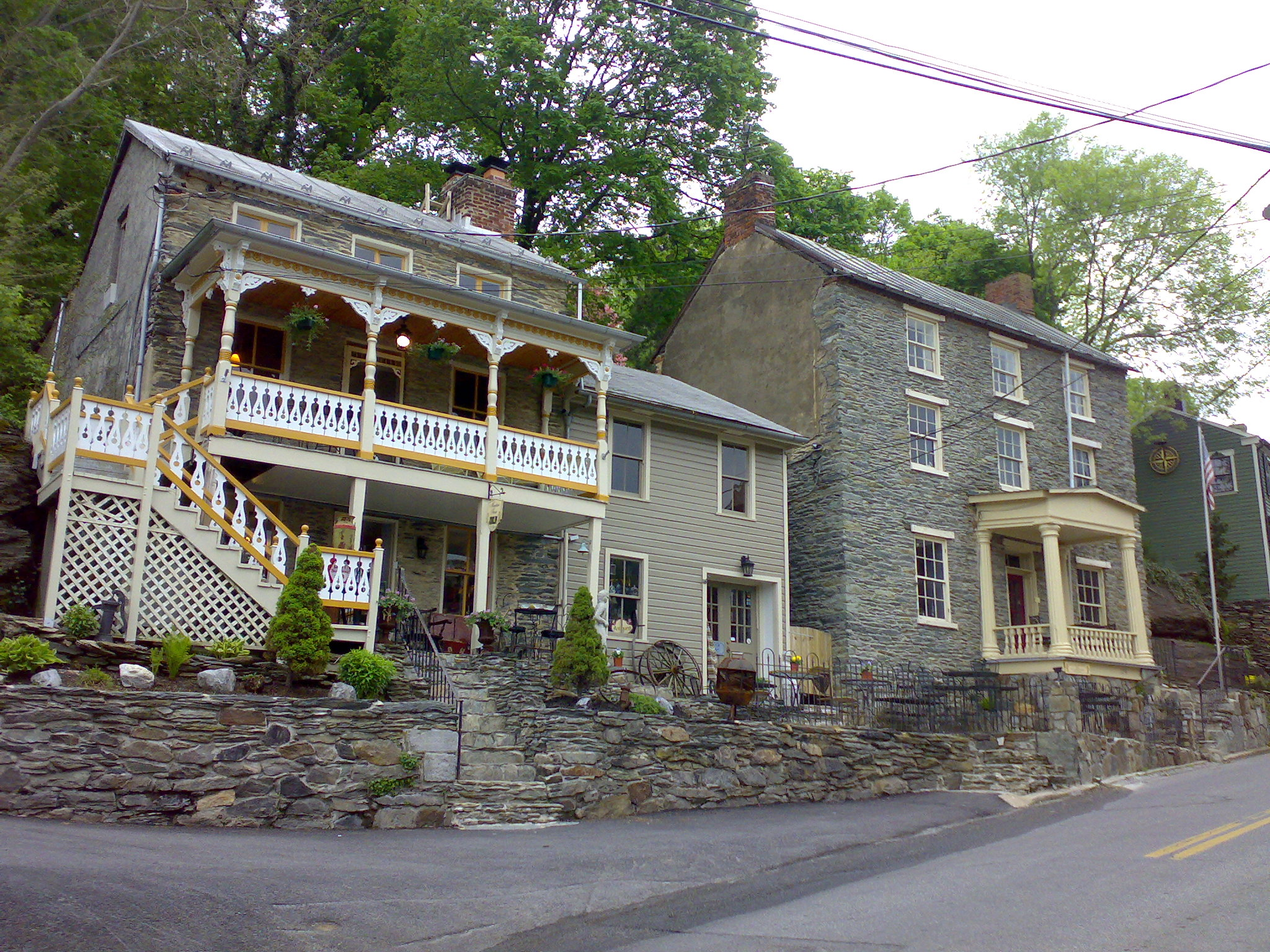
Houses in Harpers Ferry

The historic district preserves what is essentially an intact 19th-century town that occupied a pivotal role in the American Civil War, and later as a transportation center. Thousands of tourists visit the town every year, however, parking in town is scarce. In order to better manage traffic in the small streets and enhance the feel of this historic town visitors are asked to park at the nearby Visitors Center and take the Park Service bus into the town itself. Taking the bus gives visitors a view of the traditional infrastructure that made Harpers Ferry so important prior to the 20th century.

A commuter train line stops at Harpers Ferry's historic train station and links the town with Washington, D.C., with many intermediate stops.

The town was severely damaged during the Civil War, and the Armory, the only large employer, was destroyed; the only surviving building is the fire engine house, called John Brown's Fort, which is not at its original location (it traveled to Chicago and back). In addition, there was repetitive flooding in the late 19th and early 20th centuries. in the inadvertent preservation of much of the original town fabric. Two National Register properties adjoin the Harpers Ferry Historic District—the B & O Railroad Potomac River Crossing and St. Peter's Roman Catholic Church.

== See also ==
- National Register of Historic Places listings in Jefferson County, West Virginia
- Harpers Ferry National Historical Park
