= Duffields, West Virginia =

Unincorporated community in West Virginia, United States

- Unincorporated community
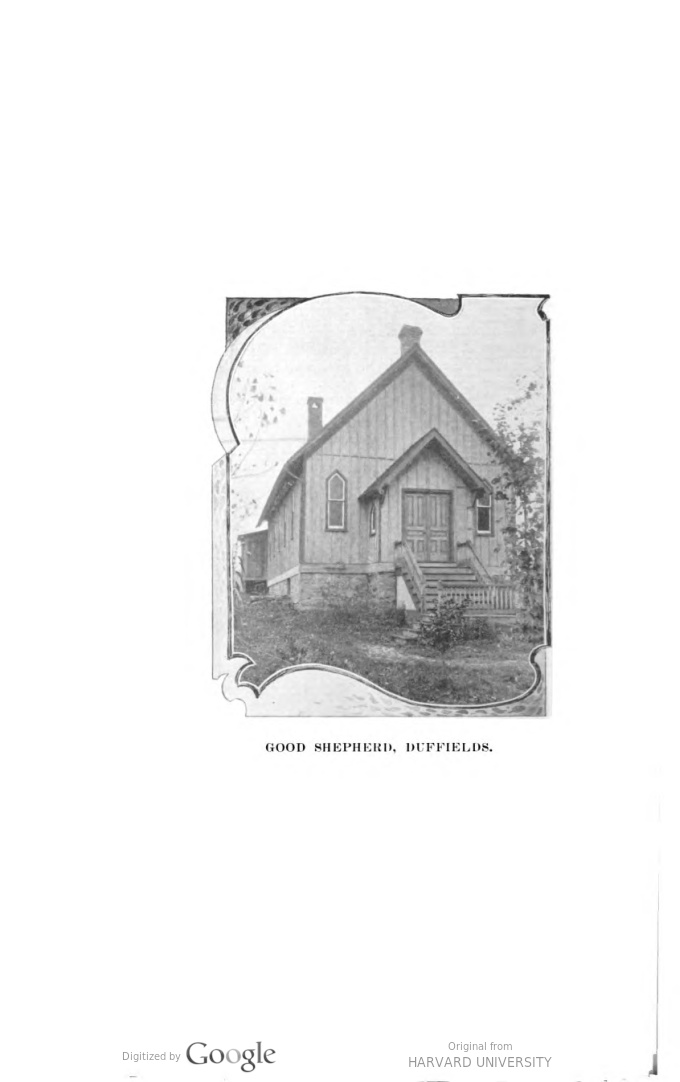
- Good Shepherd Episcopal Church

- Location within West Virginia Location within the United States
- Coordinates: 39°21′45″N 77°49′39″W
- Country: United States
- State: West Virginia
- County: Jefferson
- Time zone: UTC-5 (Eastern (EST))
  - Summer (DST): UTC-4 (EDT)
- GNIS feature ID: 1554333

Duffields is an unincorporated community in Jefferson County, West Virginia, United States. The community has fourteen sites with historical significance.

Duffields is served by Duffields station located on Flowing Springs Rd. MARC operates the Brunswick Line to the station, providing commuter rail service to and from Washington, D.C. on weekdays.

== History ==
=== Founding and early history ===
The area was settled by the Shawnee, Catawba, and Delaware people.

William Darke; who was a veteran from the French and Indian War, had property east of Duffields; his house and his extant slave quarters.

=== Duffields Depot ===
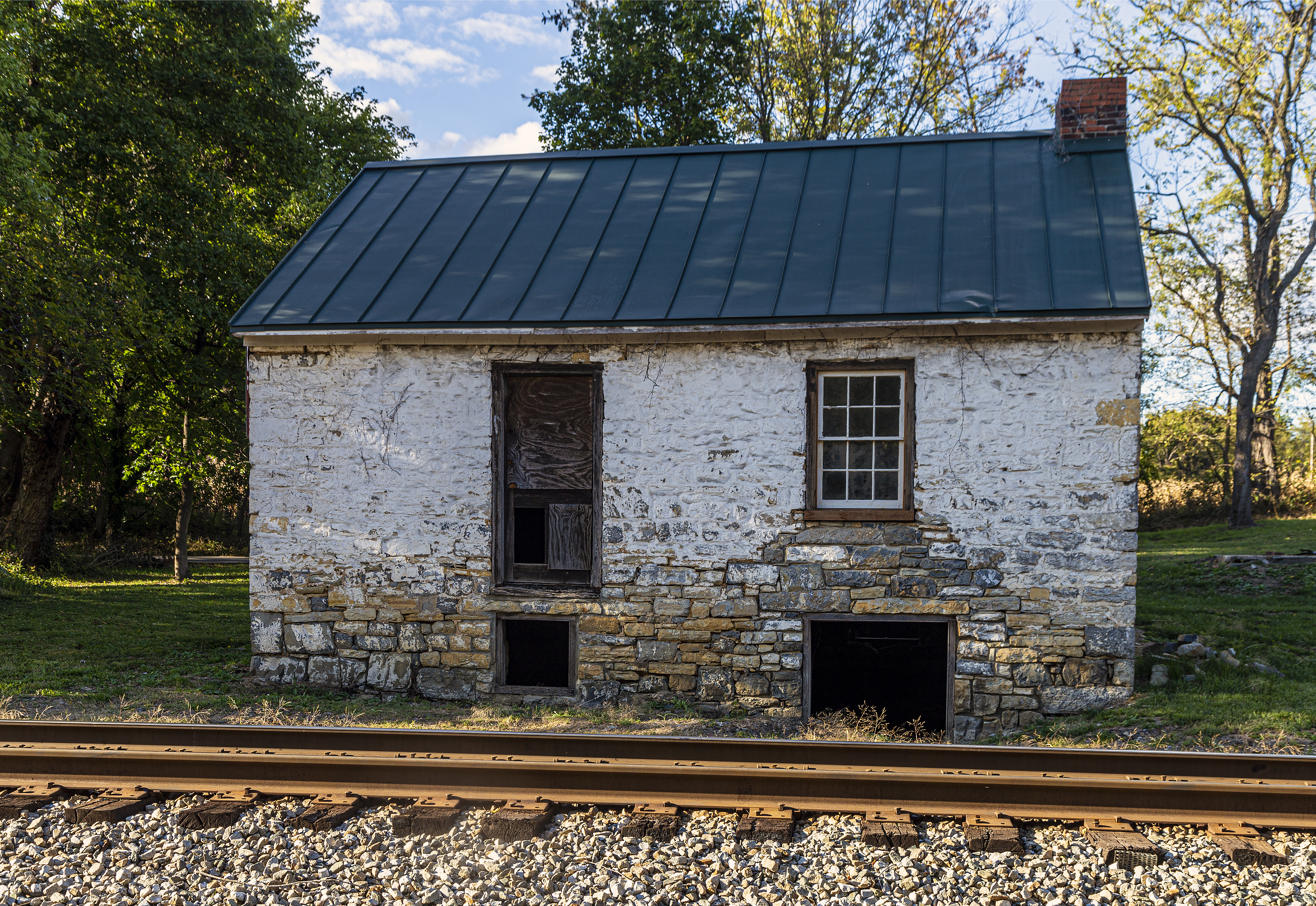
Duffields Depot in 2020

Built in Duffields in 1839, Duffields Depot is the second oldest surviving B&O depot, named for the pre-Civil War landowner who constructed it (Richard Duffield). Duffields developed in the 1840s as a result of the B&O, becoming a local center for commerce. During the American Civil War, a Confederate infantry company (Company H of the 2nd Virginia Infantry) was recruited from the area. The depot became a strategic target, most famous for its capture by Confederate Capt. John S. Mosby on June 29, 1864, as well as a raid his Rangers made on a Union army pay train on October 14, 1864 (the "Greenback raid").

The depot was listed on the National Register of Historic Places in 2007. No longer in railroad use, it is expected to become a museum.

== See also ==
- Shenandoah Junction, West Virginia
