= Baltimore and Ohio and Related Industries Historic District =

Historic district in West Virginia, United States

- U.S. National Register of Historic Places
- U.S. Historic district
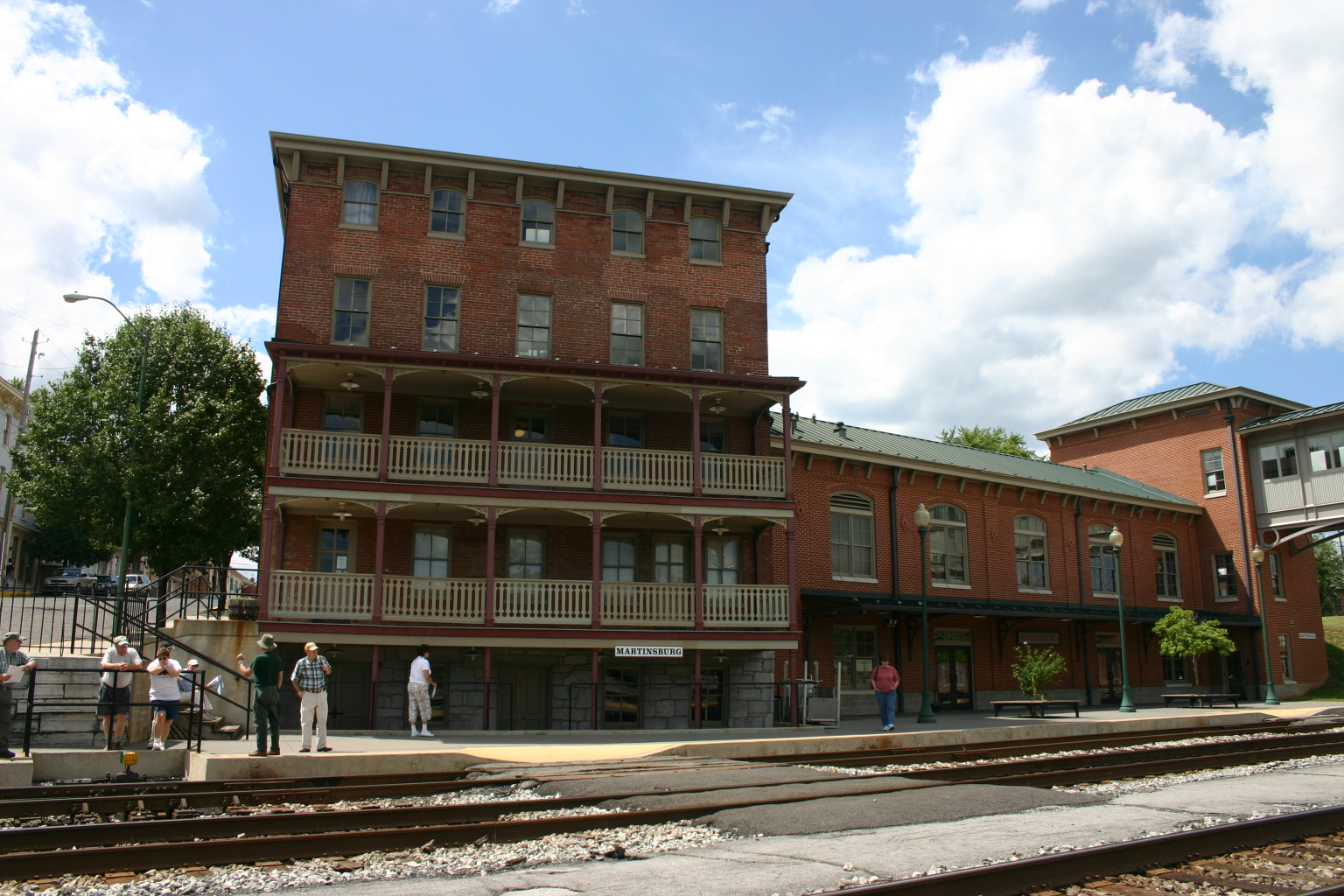
- The historic Martinsburg B. & O. Railroad Station, formerly known as the Caperton Station Hotel. Today it is an Amtrak passenger station and MARC commuter rail terminus.

- Location within West Virginia Location within the United States
- Location: Roughly bounded by B. & O. Railroad from south side of Burke Street underpass to north side of B. & O. & Pennsylvania railroad bridge, Martinsburg, West Virginia
- Coordinates: 39°27′43″N 77°57′45″W
- Area: 47 acres (19 ha)
- Architect: Multiple
- Architectural style: Italianate style
- MPS: Berkeley County MRA
- NRHP reference No.: 80004415
- Added to NRHP: December 10, 1980

The Baltimore and Ohio Related Industries Historic District comprises a portion of Martinsburg, West Virginia to either side of the Baltimore and Ohio Railroad line as it runs through the city. The district includes the Baltimore and Ohio Railroad Martinsburg Shops, a National Historic Landmark, and a variety of industrial and commercial concerns that depended on the railroad.

Along with buildings, the district includes the infrastructure associated with the building of the railroad in an urbanizing environment, such as the channelizing of Tuscarora Creek and a variety of culverts, underpasses and retaining walls. Significant buildings include, apart from the roundhouse/shop complex, the B. & O. Railroad station and hotel. Industrial buildings include coal yards, a plaster mill, feed mills, a distillery and other manufacturing facilities.
