= West Virginian (Amtrak train) =

Former Amtrak passenger train

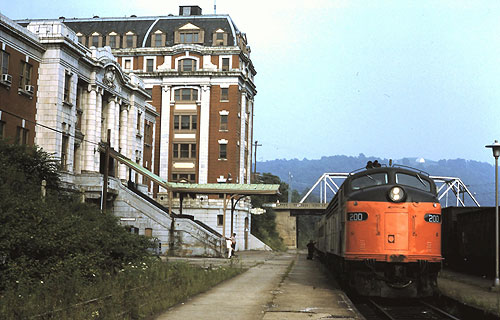
- The Potomac Special at Grafton, West Virginia in 1972

Overview
- Status: Discontinued
- Locale: West Virginia
- First service: September 8, 1971
- Last service: April 28, 1973
- Successor: Blue Ridge
- Former operator(s): Amtrak

Route
- Termini: Washington, D.C. Parkersburg, West Virginia

Technical
- Track owner(s): Baltimore & Ohio

The West Virginian, later known as the Potomac Turbo and Potomac Special, was a daily passenger train operated by Amtrak between Washington, D.C., and Parkersburg, West Virginia. This route was previously served by the Baltimore & Ohio's (B&O) train of the same name, and was the first of several services in the state of West Virginia established at the behest of US Representative Harley Orrin Staggers (D-West Virginia), the powerful chair of the House Interstate and Foreign Commerce Committee. This patronage earned the train the derisive sobriquets "Harley's Hornet" and the "Staggers Special".

== History ==
=== West Virginian ===
On its startup on May 1, 1971, Amtrak did not retain any of the three B&O intercity trains then operating west of Cumberland, Maryland. Commuter services between Washington, D.C., and Martinsburg, West Virginia continued unaffected. The situation displeased Staggers, through whose district the B&O route ran. Responding to pressure from Staggers, Amtrak introduced the West Virginian on September 8, 1971, between Washington and Parkersburg, West Virginia. It was Amtrak's first train on the B&O. The train operated with ex-Chesapeake & Ohio Railway equipment: a 52-seat coach and a snack-bar coach.

=== Potomac Turbo ===
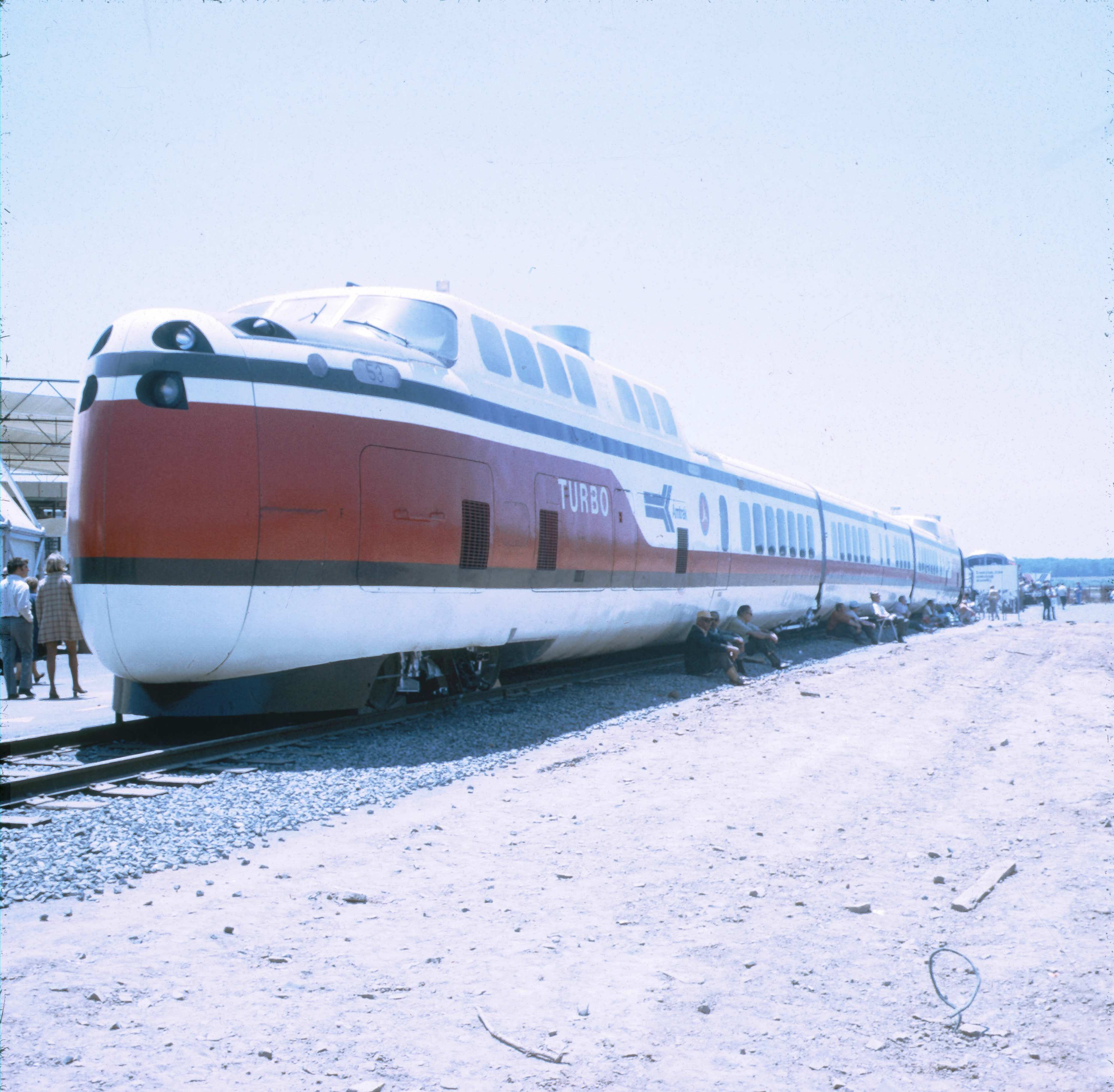
The UAC TurboTrain, seen here at Transpo '72, spent three months on the West Virginian route under the Potomac Turbo name.

On February 7, 1972, Amtrak transferred one of its two UAC TurboTrain trainsets, then on the Turboservice between New York City and Boston, Massachusetts, to the Parkersburg run. Amtrak characterized this as an experiment to see how well the TurboTrain could run on a mountainous route and whether new equipment could reinvigorate ridership on a poor-performing route. Amtrak dubbed the re-equipped train the Potomac Turbo.

Critics questioned the wisdom of running the train in a region where mountains and curves limited the train to a top speed of 80 miles per hour (130 km/h). Staggers was widely suspected of pressuring Amtrak to introduce the service; he denied that he had brought any pressure on Amtrak, although fellow representative Dan Kuykendall acknowledged suggesting to Amtrak officials that they "fix up West Virginia." Amtrak withdrew the equipment on May 13 to replace the other TurboTrain on the New York–Boston run. That train had, in turn, been sent to Washington for the Transpo '72 exposition.

=== Potomac Special ===
With the withdrawal of the TurboTrain conventional equipment returned to the Washington–Parkersburg run. Amtrak named this train the Potomac Special. Amtrak discontinued this train on May 5, 1973. In its place Amtrak introduced the Blue Ridge, which terminated at Martinsburg, West Virginia.

A later train, the Shenandoah, operated through Parkersburg to Cincinnati, Ohio. This train was introduced in 1976 and withdrawn in 1981. The Blue Ridge was transferred to MARC and continues presently as the Brunswick Line. Amtrak's Capitol Limited, a Chicago-Washington service begun in 1981, operates over the Washington-Cumberland, Maryland portion of the line.
