= Frederick Branch (Baltimore and Ohio Railroad) =

Railroad line in Frederick County, Maryland, US

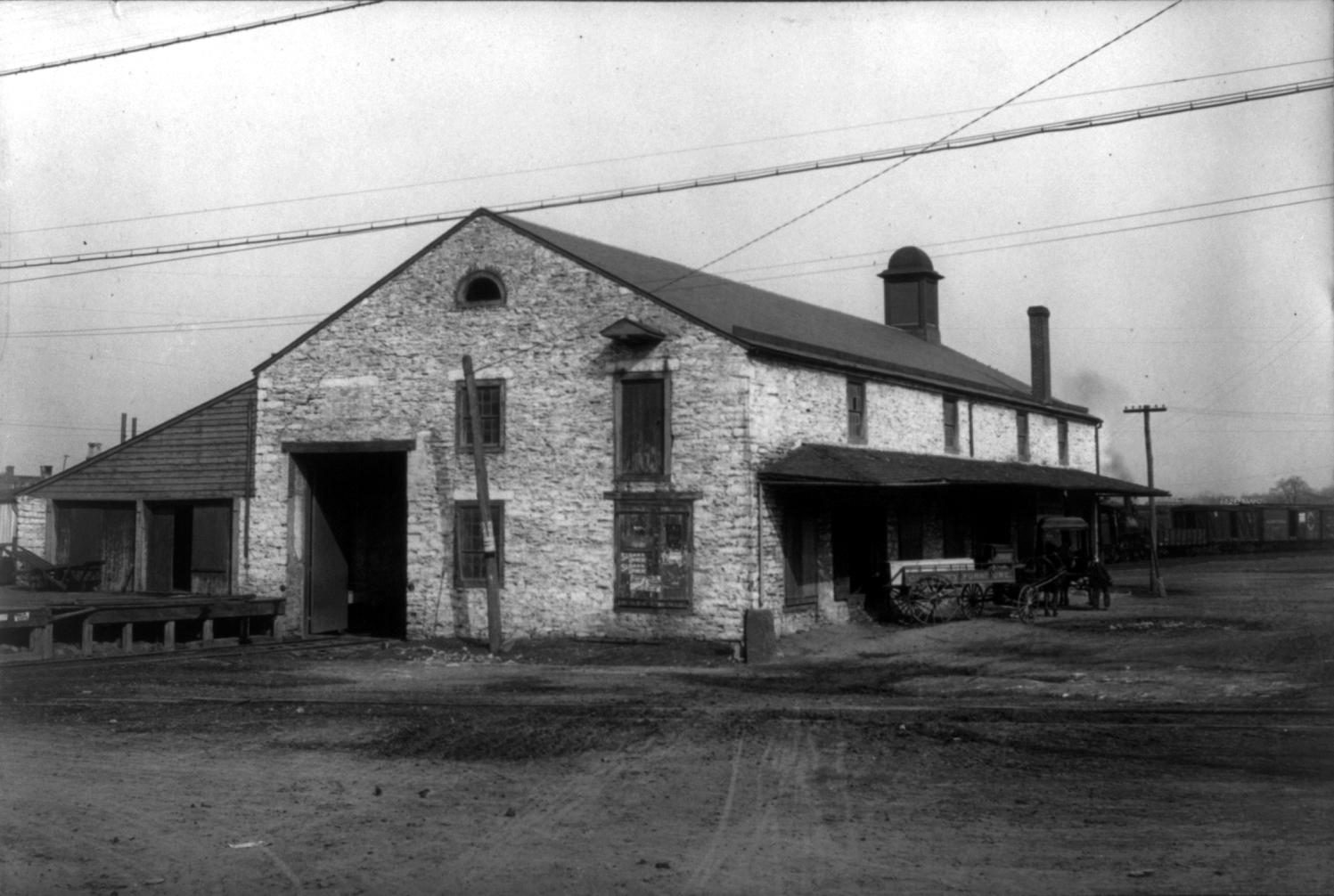
Original Frederick freight station on South Carroll Street, built 1832, from a 1906 photo. The building was demolished in 1911.

The Frederick Branch is a railroad line in Frederick County, Maryland. It was built by the Baltimore and Ohio Railroad (B&O) in 1831, and is now owned by the Maryland Department of Transportation (MDOT). The 3.4 mi (5.5 km) branch extends between Frederick Junction – a wye with the Old Main Line Subdivision of CSX Transportation on the west side of the Monocacy River – and its terminus at East Street in downtown Frederick, Maryland. The wye at Frederick Junction was the first example of its kind in the United States and is still in use today.

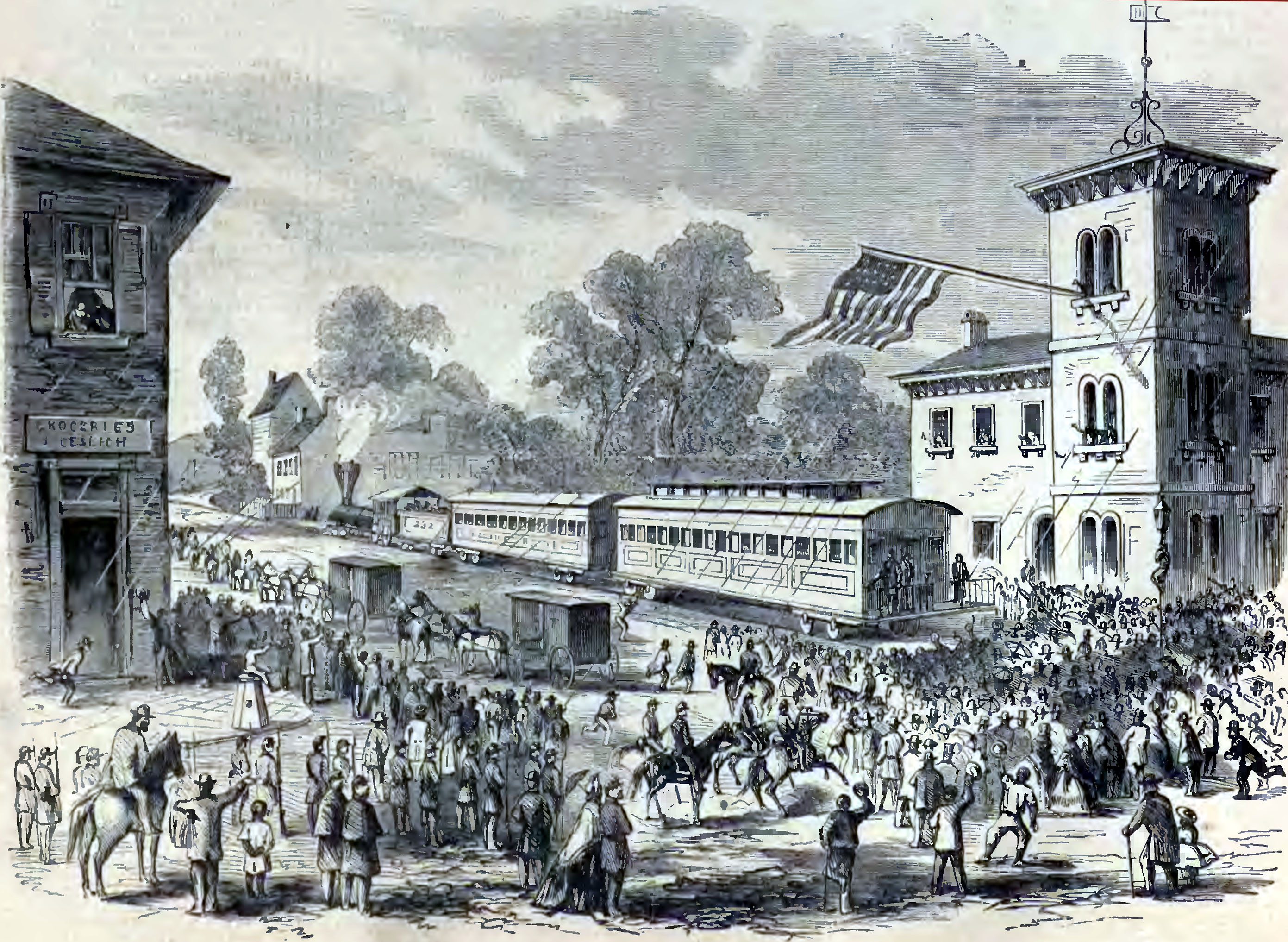
President Abraham Lincoln giving an address in Frederick on October 4, 1862, next to the station built in 1854, at East All Saints and Market Streets.

== History ==
The branch opened in December 1831 with a ceremonial train, pulled by horses, carrying directors of the B&O and various politicians from Baltimore. In planning the route of the Old Main Line, the B&O decided against building the main line directly through Frederick, preferring instead to take advantage of a valley grade to the south of the city. The city's first train station, built in 1832 at South Carroll Street, was the B&O's second oldest permanent station, and was used mainly for freight. A new passenger depot was built in 1854 at East All Saints and Market Streets, and the old station continued as a freight station until circa 1910. A station at Frederick Junction was opened after the Civil War and operated through the World War II era.

The branch was initially used by the many mills in the city to rapidly ship flour to Baltimore for sale. Outbound freight traffic later diversified to include milk, bricks, limestone, and some manufactured goods from Frederick.

The branch connected with two other railroads in downtown Frederick: first, the Frederick and Pennsylvania Line Railroad Company in 1872, (later part of the Pennsylvania Railroad) connected near East Street and South Street, and then in 1896, the Hagerstown and Frederick Railway connected near the small B&O rail yard and terminal along South Street.

During the Great Depression of the 1930s, traffic on the Frederick Branch decreased. In 1933, the B&O began using gas-electric rail cars to operate its commuter trains between Frederick and Baltimore. Passenger service lasted until November 1949, and the branch gradually fell into disuse as local business customers switched to trucks to ship their products.

In 1987, the B&O assets, including the Frederick Branch, were acquired by CSX. As of 2012, the only remaining freight customer on the branch was Willard Agri Services of Frederick, located on Wisner Street. This service ended in 2020, leaving Frederick with no freight rail service. The line is now exclusively used by MARC passenger rail service.

== MARC commuter service ==
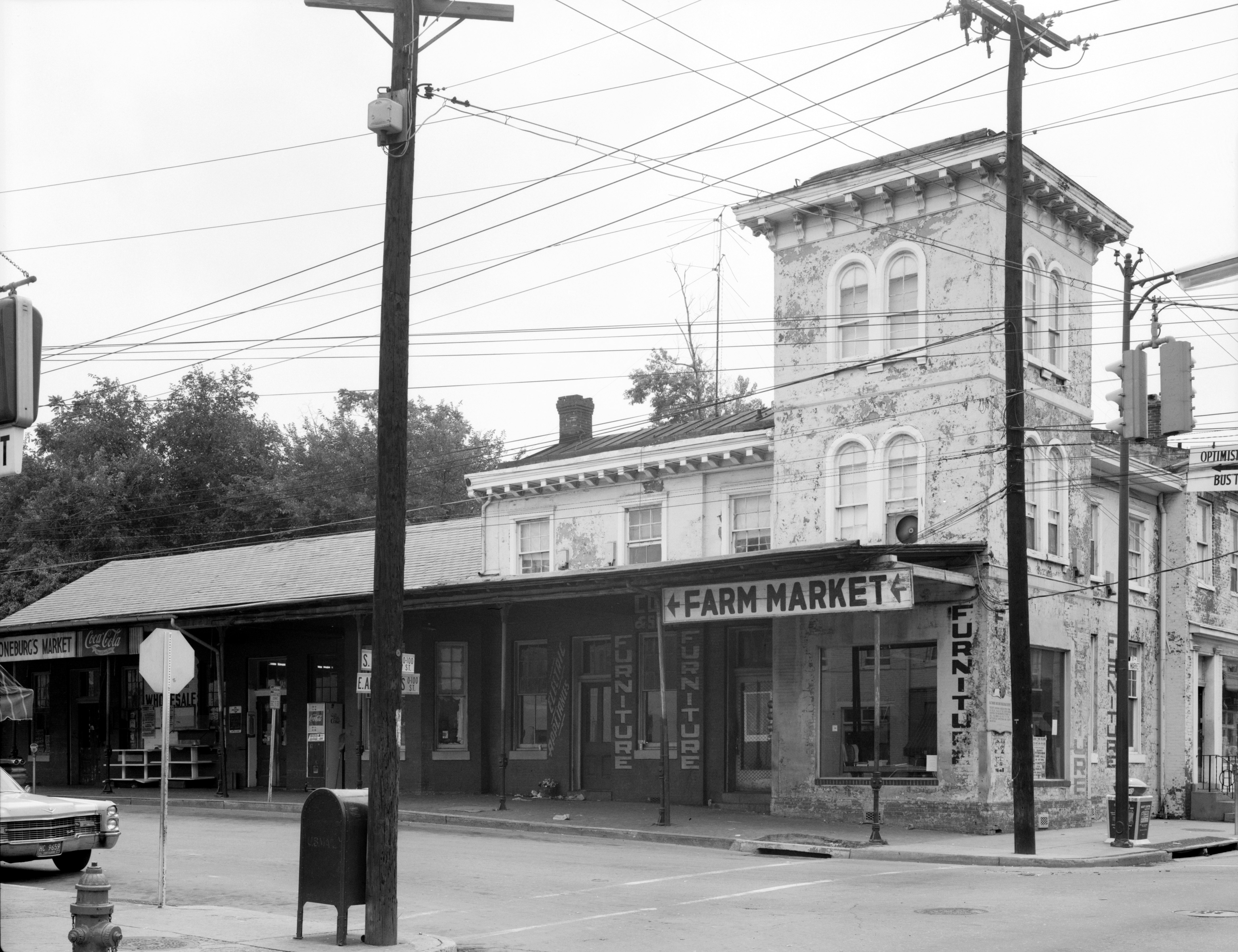
The 1854 station, in a 1970 photo. The B&O closed the station in 1948.

In December 2001, passenger trains returned to Frederick with the launch of MARC Brunswick Line Frederick branch service. The Maryland Transit Administration funded upgrades to the Frederick Branch and to 9.9 mi (15.9 km) of the Old Main Line between Frederick Junction and Point of Rocks, Maryland. MDOT purchased the Frederick Branch from CSX and realigned the wye track at Frederick Junction. Two new passenger stations were constructed: Frederick station near the branch's original terminus at South Street, and Monocacy station, which is behind a shopping center near Frederick Junction. A small yard with capacity for three train sets was also constructed along Reichs Ford Road.
