= Brunswick Line =

MARC commuter rail line in Maryland, West Virginia and Washington, D.C.

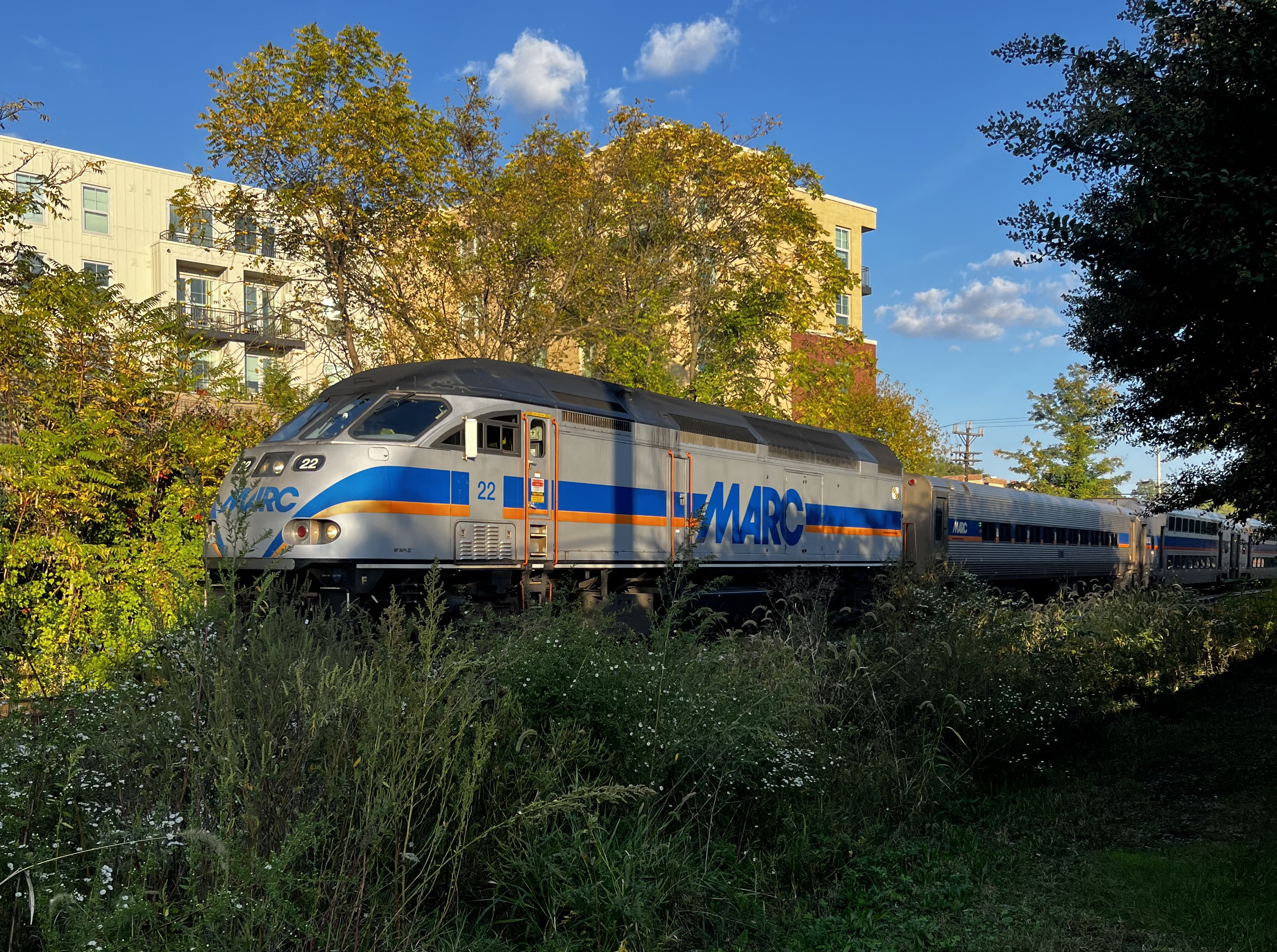
- A northbound MARC train on the Brunswick Line, after having departed Kensington Station.

Overview
- Owner: CSX Transportation (tracks, except Frederick Branch)
- Locale: Washington D.C. and northern Maryland suburbs; West Virginia
- Termini: Washington Union Station; Brunswick, MD, Frederick, MD, Martinsburg, WV
- Stations: 19

Service
- Type: Commuter rail
- System: MARC Train
- Train number: 870–895
- Operator: Alstom/Maryland Transit Administration
- Rolling stock: Siemens Charger, MPI MPXpress MP36PH-3C, Bombardier Multilevel
- Daily ridership: 7,497 (June 2017)

History
- Opened: 1873

Technical
- Line length: 74 mi (119 km)
- Num of tracks: 2-5
- Track gauge: 4 ft 8 1/2 in (1,435 mm) standard gauge
- Operating speed: 34 mph (55 km/h) (avg.)
Route map
Brunswick Line highlighted in yellow

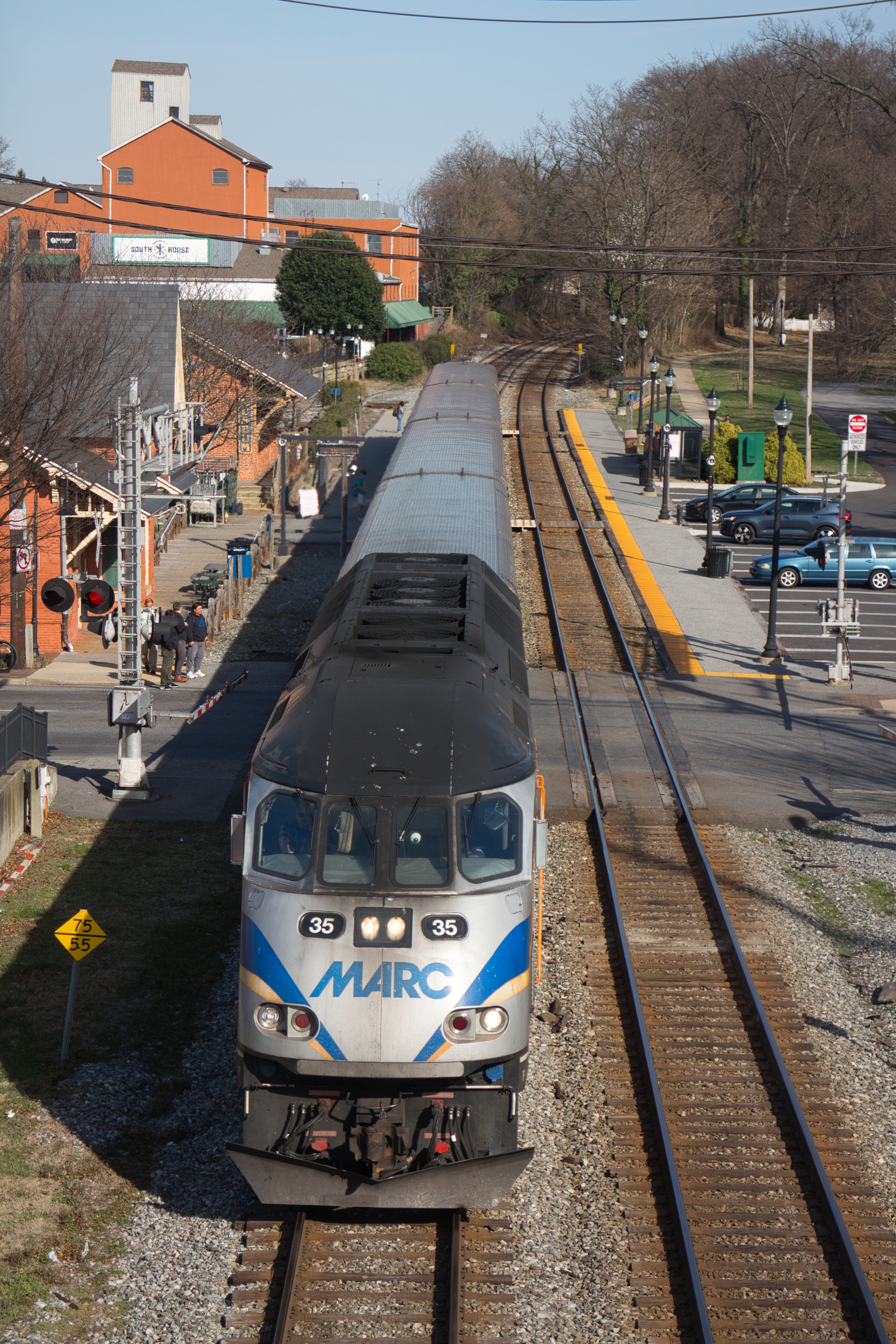
A MARC train stopped at Gaithersburg station in Montgomery County MD along the Brunswick Line.

The Brunswick Line is a MARC commuter rail line between Washington, D.C., and Martinsburg, West Virginia, with a branch to Frederick, Maryland. It primarily serves the northern and western suburbs of Washington. The 74-mile line, MARC's second-longest line, is operated by Alstom and runs on CSX-owned track, including the Metropolitan, Old Main Line, and Cumberland subdivisions. It is the successor to commuter services provided by the Baltimore and Ohio Railroad (B&O) that date to the mid-19th century.

== History ==
The B&O had long operated commuter trains between Washington and Martinsburg, and continued to do so after the start of Amtrak on May 1, 1971. Maryland began subsidizing the trains in 1974 and, in 1975, assumed full responsibility for the subsidy and equipment replacement. West Virginia followed suit soon after, guaranteeing service to its stations.

In 1983, as part of a federal requirement for Conrail (which operated the Penn Line service) to end its operation of commuter railroads on behalf of states, the state government of Maryland took control of its commuter railroads, organizing them under the "MARC" (Maryland Area Rail Commuter) service name. Trains on the Brunswick Line were operated under contract by CSX Transportation, successor to the B&O. Brunswick Line service was augmented in 1986 when Amtrak transferred its Washington–Martinsburg Blue Ridge to MARC after agreeing to subsidize the train for five years.

In May 2010, MARC announced that it planned to find a new operator for the Brunswick and Camden Lines after CSX announced its desire to discontinue operation of commuter trains. MARC selected Bombardier Transportation Services USA Corporation (BTS) (a subsidiary of the Canadian company Bombardier Transportation) to replace CSX, and BTS assumed operations and maintenance of the lines on June 29, 2013. CSX continues to dispatch the lines.

== Rolling stock ==
Brunswick Line trains typically have four to six single- or bilevel passenger cars and one or two diesel locomotives. The trains operate in a push-pull configuration, with the cab car typically facing Washington.

Before they were replaced by new Bombardier Multilevel II cars, MARC's ex-Metra Pullman Gallery cars were used exclusively on the Brunswick Line, which is the only MARC line with all low-level platforms (except the Frederick Branch, which has a high-level platform at Monocacy station).

== Service ==
The Brunswick Line has service only on weekdays, with nine trains in each direction in the peak direction (toward Washington during morning rush hour and toward Brunswick, Frederick, or Martinsburg during evening rush hour. An additional train runs outbound from Union Station on Fridays. Three of the nine trains in each direction serve the Frederick branch. Of the remainder, three inbound and three outbound serve Martinsburg, while the remaining three round trips originate or terminate at Brunswick.

Transit (Frederick County) operates Meet-the-MARC bus shuttles between Frederick and Point of Rocks, meeting trains that do not serve the Frederick Branch. The agency operates a morning bus shuttle operates from Walkersville to Frederick. A bus shuttle operated by the Eastern Panhandle Transit Authority, runs from Brunswick to Martinsburg in the evening, meeting trains that don't serve West Virginia.

Union Station is a stop on Amtrak's Floridian which shares much of the Brunswick Line's route; Martinsburg, Harpers Ferry, and Rockville are also served by the Floridian. Connections to the Washington Metro's Red Line are available at Rockville, Silver Spring, and Union Station.

On September 28, 2026, one weekday round trip began operating between Brunswick and Camden Station via the Brunswick and Camden lines.

== Stations ==
The Brunswick Line serves the following stations. Not all trains stop at all stations.

State	Town/City	Station	Connections
	Washington, D.C.	Union Station	Amtrak: Acela, Cardinal, Floridian, Carolinian, Crescent, Northeast Regional, Palmetto, Silver Meteor, Vermonter, Thruway Bus to Charlottesville, Virginia; Metrorail: Red Line; VRE: ■ Manassas Line, ■ Fredericksburg Line; MARC: ■ Camden Line, ■ Penn Line; Metrobus, Loudoun County Transit, OmniRide, MTA Commuter Bus
MD	Silver Spring	Silver Spring	Metrorail: Red Line; Flash BRT: Blue Line, Orange Line; Metrobus, Ride On, MTA Commuter Bus
MD	Kensington	Kensington	Ride On
MD	Garrett Park	Garrett Park	Ride On
MD	Rockville	Rockville	Amtrak: Floridian; Metrorail: Red Line; Metrobus, Ride On
MD	Washington Grove	Washington Grove	Ride On
MD	Gaithersburg	Gaithersburg	Ride On
MD	Gaithersburg	Metropolitan Grove	Ride On
MD	Germantown	Germantown	Ride On
MD	Boyds	Boyds (Note: Closure of station due to low ridership was proposed in an early-2006 MARC plan that was ultimately canceled.)	
MD	Barnesville	Barnesville	
MD	Dickerson	Dickerson	
MD	Frederick Branch:		
MD	Frederick	Monocacy	TransIT, MTA Commuter Bus
MD	Frederick	Frederick	TransIT, MTA Commuter Bus, Greyhound Lines, Loudoun County Transit, Amtrak Thruway
MD	Brunswick Line:		
MD	Point of Rocks	Point of Rocks	TransIT
MD	Brunswick	Brunswick	Eastern Panhandle Transit Authority (Note: Only served by an evening connecting bus from Brunswick to West Virginia stations)
WV	Harpers Ferry	Harpers Ferry	Amtrak: Floridian; Eastern Panhandle Transit Authority
WV	Duffields	Duffields	Eastern Panhandle Transit Authority
WV	Martinsburg	Martinsburg	Amtrak: Floridian; Eastern Panhandle Transit Authority
