= B & O Railroad Potomac River Crossing =

- U.S. National Register of Historic Places
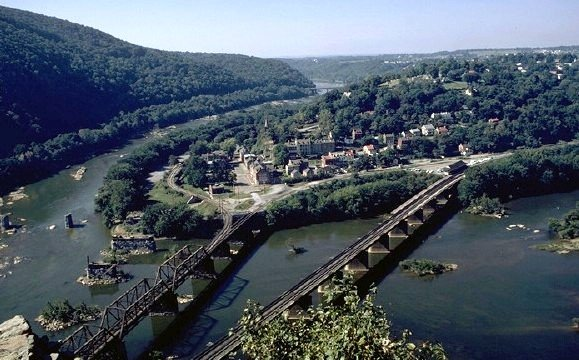
- From left to right: Stone piers from 1851 at Bollman Truss Railroad Bridge; the bridge in 1894; and the bridge in 1931

- Location within West Virginia Location within the United States
- Location: Harper's Ferry, West Virginia, U.S.
- Coordinates: 39°19′27″N 77°43′43″W
- Area: 15 acres (6.1 ha)
- Built: 1837
- Architect: Wendel Bollman
- Demolished: 1936 (flood)
- NRHP reference No.: 78001484
- Added to NRHP: February 14, 1978

The B & O Railroad Potomac River Crossing is a 15-acre (6.1 ha) historic site where a set of railroad bridges, originally built by the Baltimore and Ohio Railroad, span the Potomac River between Sandy Hook, Maryland, and Harpers Ferry, West Virginia. The site was added to the National Register of Historic Places on February 14, 1978, for its significance in commerce, engineering, industry, invention, and transportation.

It is the site of multiple successive railroad bridges built between 1836 and 1931, including two still-active CSX bridges (1894 and 1931).

== History ==
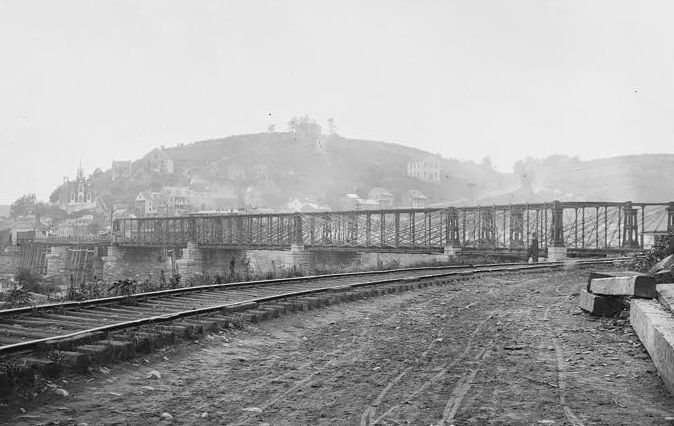
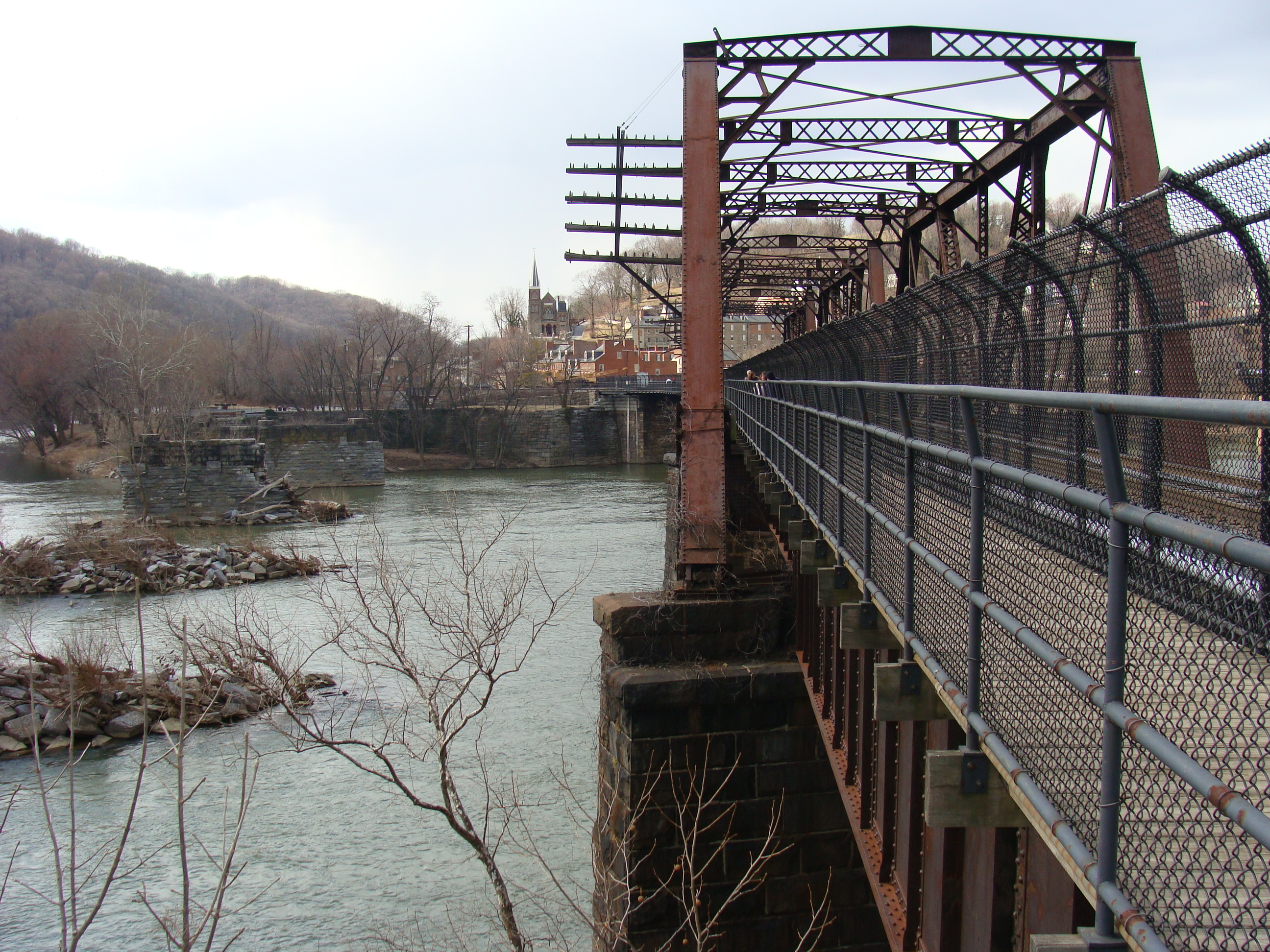
The 1851 Bollman Bridge (top) c.1860s. and its remains next to the 1894 bridge in 2009 (bottom).

The original Harper's Ferry operated from 1733 until it was replaced by a timber covered road bridge in about 1824 at the confluence of the Potomac and Shenandoah Rivers.

Built in 1836–1837, the B&O's first crossing over the Potomac was an 830-foot (250 m) covered wood truss. It was the only rail crossing of the Potomac River until after the American Civil War. The single-track bridge, composed of six river spans plus a span over the Chesapeake and Ohio Canal, was designed by Benjamin Henry Latrobe II. In 1837 the Winchester and Potomac Railroad reached Harpers Ferry from the south, and Latrobe joined it to the B&O line using a "Y" span.

John Brown used the B&O bridge at the beginning of his failed attempt to start a slave insurrection in Virginia and further south.

The bridge was destroyed during the Civil War and replaced temporarily with a pontoon bridge.

The two crossings today, which are on different alignments, are from the late 19th century and early 20th century. A steel Pratt truss and plate girder bridge was built in 1894 to carry the B&O Valley Line (now the CSX Shenandoah Subdivision) toward Winchester, Virginia, along the Shenandoah River. This was complemented in 1930–1931 with a deck plate girder bridge that carried the B&O Main Line (now the CSX Cumberland Subdivision) to Martinsburg, West Virginia.

A rail tunnel, known as the Harpers Ferry Tunnel, was built at the same time as the 1894 bridge to carry the Valley Line through the Maryland Heights, eliminating a sharp curve. In the 1930s the western portal was widened during the construction of the second bridge to allow the broadest possible curve across the river.

=== Accident ===
On December 21, 2019, a CSX freight train derailed on the bridge, sending several cars into the river. There were no injuries and the bridge was later reopened.

== Gallery ==
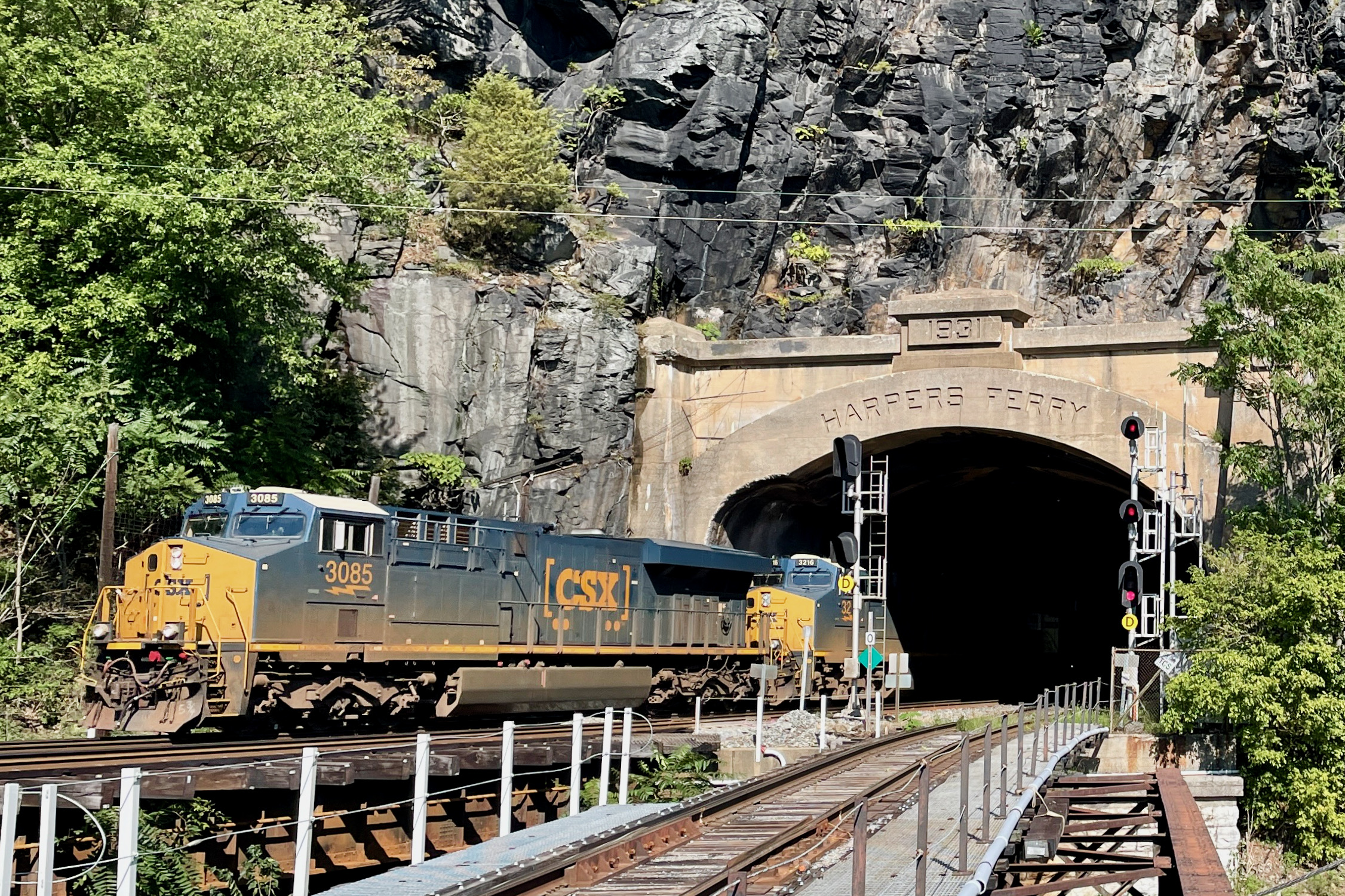
West Portal of the Harpers Ferry Tunnel

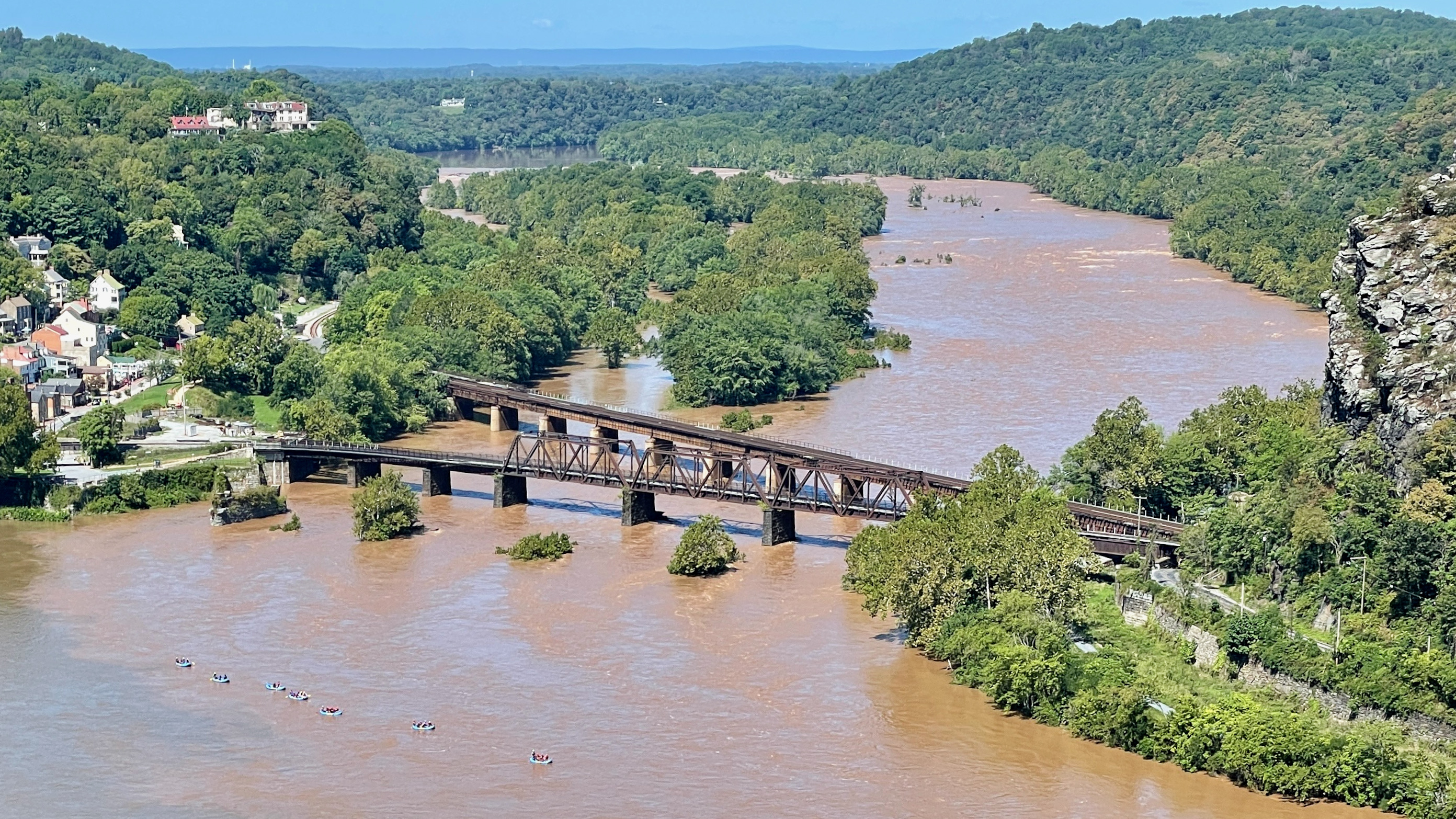
View from the Split Rock overlook in 2021

== See also ==
- Harpers Ferry National Historical Park
- Harpers Ferry Historic District
- John Brown's Raid on Harpers Ferry
- List of bridges documented by the Historic American Engineering Record in Maryland
- List of bridges documented by the Historic American Engineering Record in West Virginia
- List of bridges on the National Register of Historic Places in Maryland
- List of bridges on the National Register of Historic Places in West Virginia
