= Blue Ridge (train) =

Defunct Amtrak train service

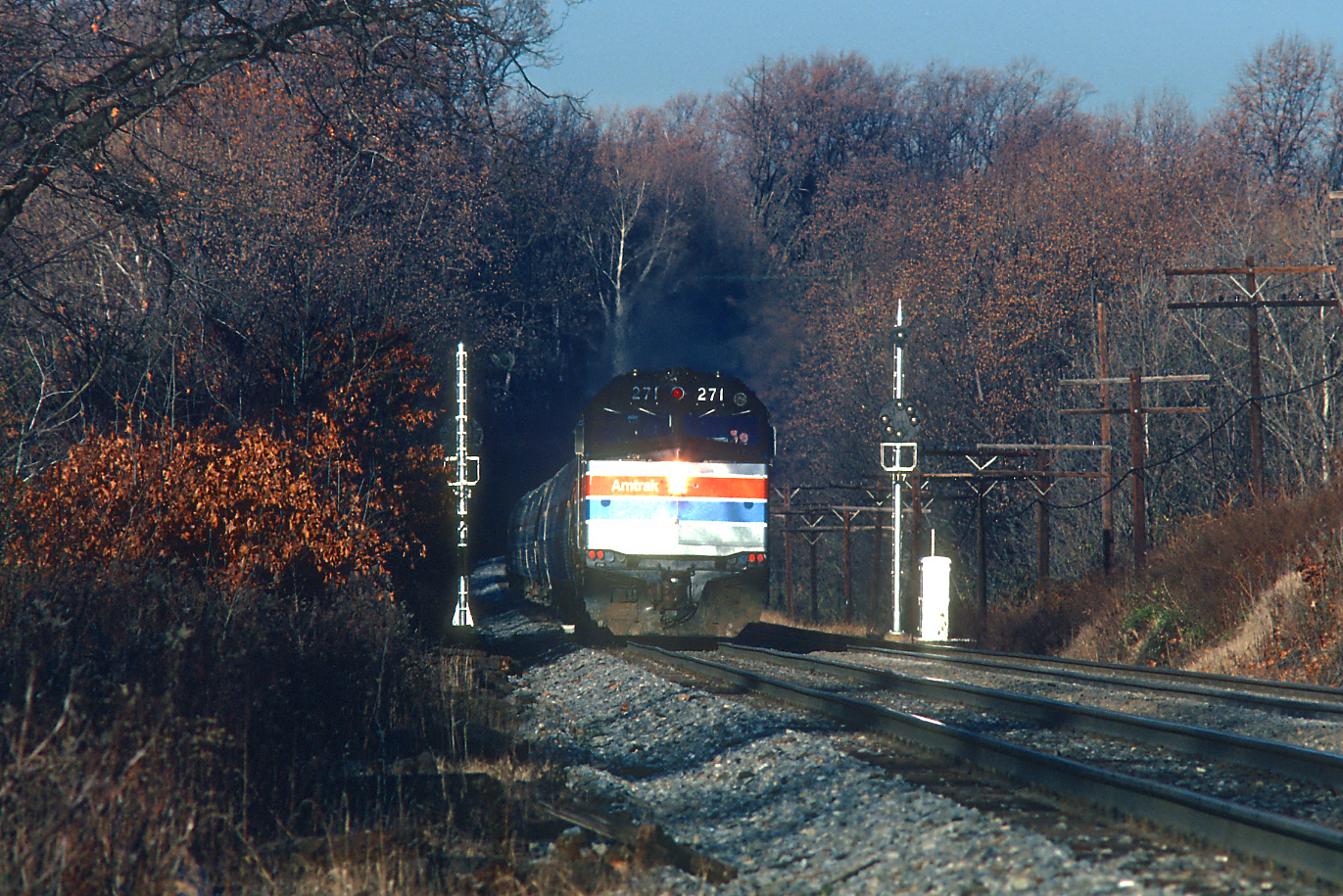
- The Blue Ridge in December 1980

Overview
- Service type: Commuter rail
- Status: Transferred to MTA Maryland
- Locale: West Virginia
- Predecessor: Potomac Special
- First service: May 7, 1973
- Last service: 1986
- Successor: Brunswick Line (MARC Train)
- Former operator(s): Amtrak

Route
- Termini: Washington, D.C; Cumberland, Maryland
- Stops: 9
- Distance travelled: 143 mi (230 km)
- Average journey time: 3 hours, 5 minutes
- Service frequency: Daily
- Train number(s): 701–704

On-board services
- Class(es): Unreserved coach

Technical
- Track gauge: 4 ft 8 1/2 in (1,435 mm)
- Track owner(s): B&O Railroad

The Blue Ridge was a daily Amtrak passenger train that operated between Washington, D.C., and Cumberland, Maryland (Martinsburg, West Virginia after 1976). Service began in 1973; it was merged into the MARC Brunswick Line commuter rail service in 1986.

== History ==
The Blue Ridge was introduced on May 7, 1973, as a replacement for the Potomac Special. It was curtailed from the Potomac Special terminus of Parkersburg, West Virginia to Cumberland, and retimed to better serve commuters. In December 1975, the Blue Ridge became the first train outside the Northeast Corridor to receive new Amfleet coaches. The Blue Ridge was truncated to Martinsburg on October 31, 1976 upon the introduction of the Washington–Cincinnati, Ohio Shenandoah. Weekend service was dropped on October 1, 1981 amid cuts to Amtrak services.

In 1986, Amtrak transferred the Blue Ridge to the Maryland Mass Transit Administration (now the Maryland Transit Administration), who incorporated it into the MARC Brunswick Line. As part of the transfer, Amtrak agreed to subsidize the train for five years. MARC continued to use the name during the late 1980s.
