= Germantown station (MARC) =

MARC rail station in Germantown, Maryland, United States

Germantown
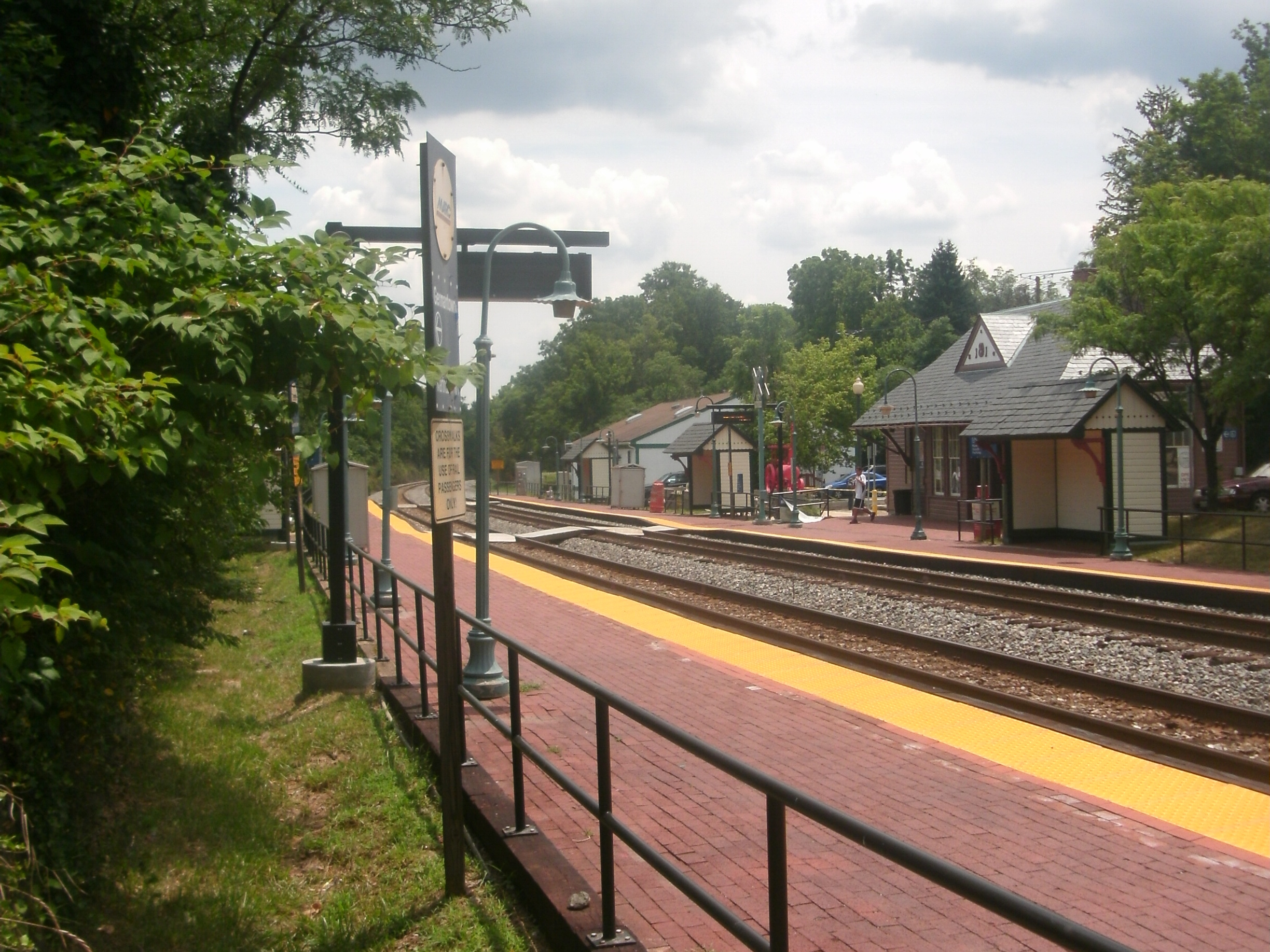
- The platforms at Germantown in July 2012

General information
- Location: 19311 Mateny Hill Road; Germantown, Maryland
- Coordinates: 39°10′24″N 77°16′14.4″W
- Line: Metropolitan Subdivision
- Platforms: 2 side platforms
- Tracks: 2

Construction
- Parking: Yes
- Accessible: Yes

Passengers
- November 2022: 220 (daily) (MARC)

Services
Preceding station	MARC	Following station
Boyds toward Martinsburg or Frederick	Brunswick Line	Metropolitan Grove toward Union Station
Barnesville toward Brunswick	Brunswick Line limited service	Metropolitan Grove toward Camden Station
Former services
Preceding station	Baltimore and Ohio Railroad	Following station
Boyds toward Chicago	Main Line	Gaithersburg toward Jersey City
Boyds toward Chicago	Main Line	Waring toward Jersey City
Location

Germantown station is a passenger rail station on the MARC Brunswick Line between Washington, D.C., and Martinsburg, West Virginia (with a branch to Frederick, Maryland). It is one of the busiest stations on the Brunswick Line along with Silver Spring and Rockville stations. All Brunswick Line trains stop at this station.

The original Germantown station, which was built by Ephraim Francis Baldwin for the Baltimore and Ohio Railroad was destroyed by arsonists in 1978, and was reconstructed for MARC.
