= Barnesville station =

MARC rail station in Barnesville, Maryland, United States

Barnesville
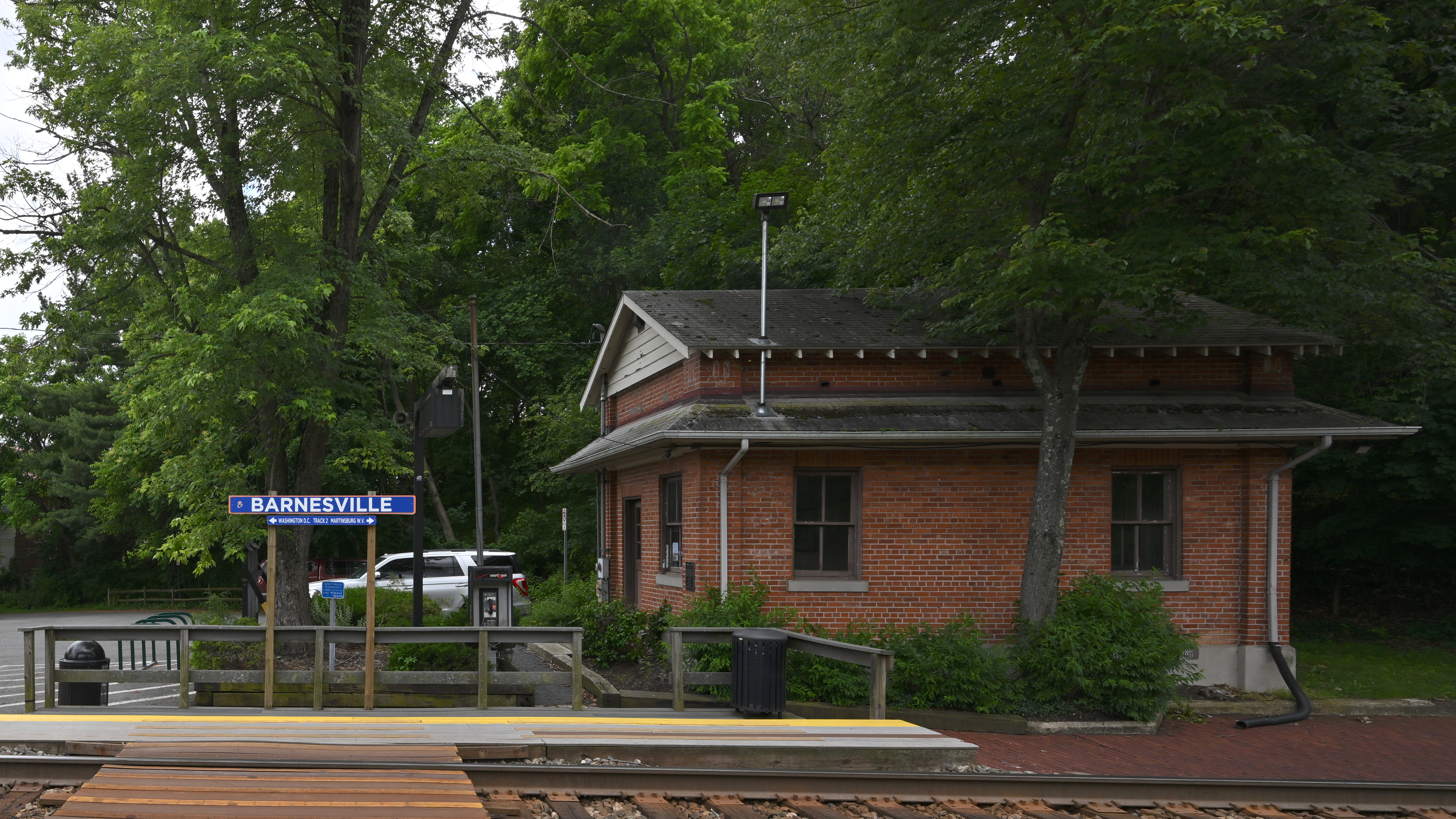
- Barnesville MARC station from track 1

General information
- Location: 8 Beallsville Road; Barnesville, Maryland
- Coordinates: 39°12′35″N 77°22′57″W
- Line: Metropolitan Subdivision
- Platforms: 2 side platforms
- Tracks: 2

Construction
- Parking: Yes
- Accessible: No

History
- Opened: May 1, 1873 (ceremonial opening); May 25, 1873 (regular passenger service)
- Rebuilt: c. 1920; 1977
- Former names: Sellman's

Passengers
- November 2022: 31 (daily) (MARC)

Services
Preceding station	MARC	Following station
Dickerson toward Martinsburg or Frederick	Brunswick Line	Boyds toward Union Station
Point of Rocks toward Brunswick	Brunswick Line limited service	Germantown toward Camden Station
Former services
Preceding station	Baltimore and Ohio Railroad	Following station
Dickerson toward Chicago	Main Line	Boyds toward Jersey City
Dickerson toward Chicago	Main Line	Buck Lodge toward Jersey City
Location

Barnesville is an active commuter railroad train station in Barnesville, Montgomery County, Maryland. Located on Beallsville Road (Route 109), Barnesville station services trains of MARC Train's Brunswick Line between Union Station in Washington D.C. and Martinsburg, West Virginia. Additional trains operate to Frederick, Maryland. Amtrak's Capitol Limited operates through the station, but does not make any stops. Barnesville station contains two low-level side platforms, connected by a pathway across the tracks.

Service in Barnesville began with the opening of the Metropolitan Branch Railroad on May 25, 1873. At that time, the station held the name of Sellman's for the name of the landowner (William Oliver Sellman) the railroad built the line on in the area. At that time, the locals erected a wooden station that also contained the local post office. A new station opened south of Route 109 c. 1920. The station came down in the 1950s, replaced in 1977 with a Washington Gas Light Company metering station in Rockville.

== Station layout ==
The station is not compliant with the Americans with Disabilities Act of 1990.
