= Boyds station =

MARC rail station in Boyds, Maryland, United States

Boyds
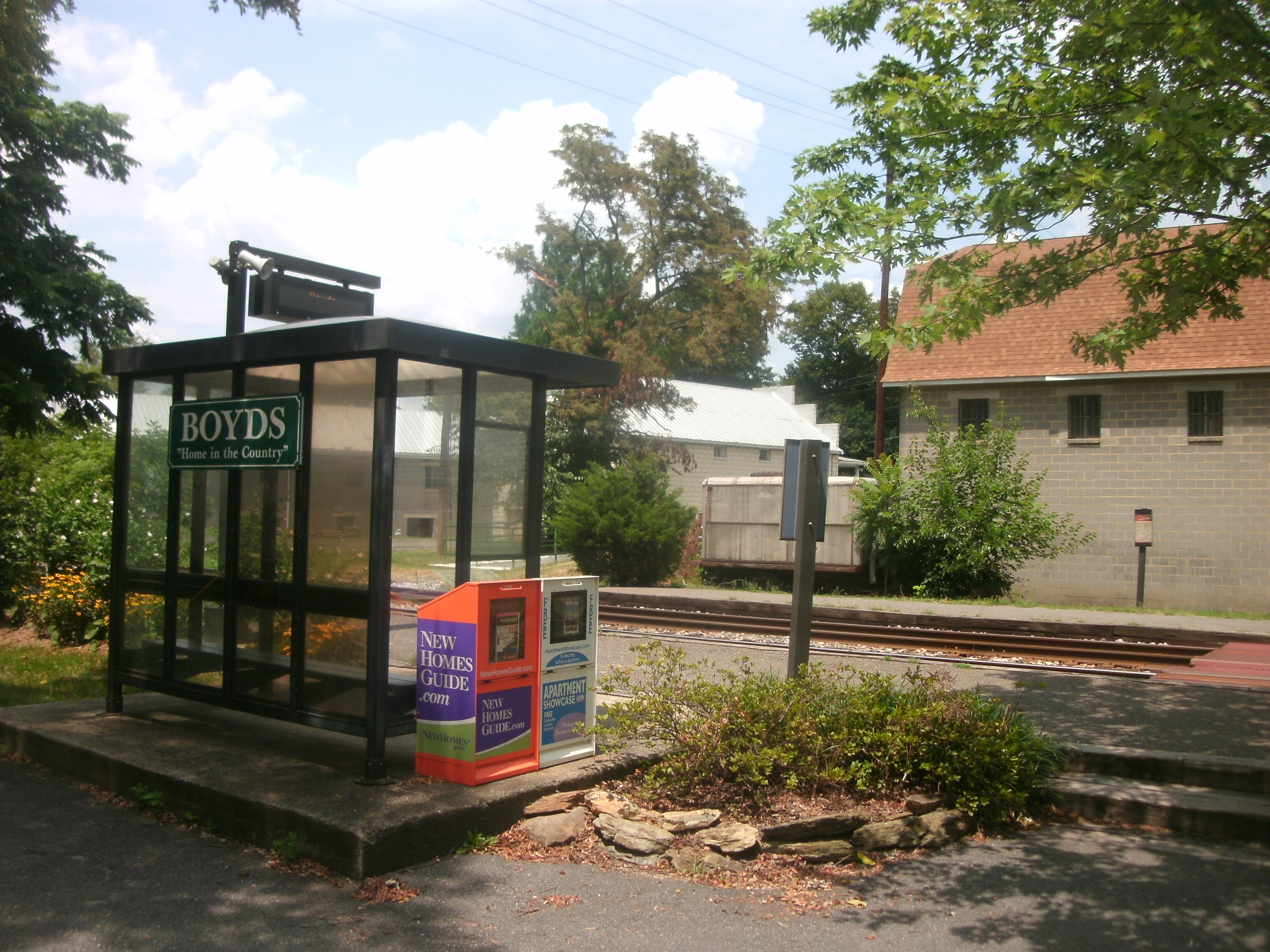
- The station at Boyds, as seen from the parking lot in July 2012.

General information
- Location: 15031 Clopper Road, Boyds, Maryland, U.S.
- Coordinates: 39°11′03.2″N 77°18′51.2″W
- Line: Metropolitan Subdivision
- Platforms: 2 side platforms
- Tracks: 2

Construction
- Parking: Yes
- Cycle facilities: Yes
- Accessible: No

History
- Opened: May 1, 1873 (ceremonial opening); May 25, 1873 (regular passenger service)
- Rebuilt: 1887

Key dates
- 1928: 1887 station depot razed

Passengers
- November 2022: 9 (daily) (MARC)

Services
Preceding station	MARC	Following station
Barnesville toward Martinsburg or Frederick	Brunswick Line	Germantown toward Union Station
Former services
Preceding station	Baltimore and Ohio Railroad	Following station
Barnesville toward Chicago	Main Line	Germantown toward Jersey City
Buck Lodge toward Chicago	Main Line	Germantown toward Jersey City
Location

Boyds is a commuter railroad train station in Boyds, Montgomery County, Maryland. Located on Clopper Road west of the junction with Maryland Routes 117 and 121, the station serves MARC's Brunswick Line between Washington Union Station in Washington, D.C., and Martinsburg, West Virginia, along with some trains to Frederick, Maryland. Trains for Amtrak's Capitol Limited bypass the station. The next station west is Barnesville and the next one east is Germantown. Boyds station consists of two low-level side platforms and a single three-sided glass shelter, along with a small parking lot. It also includes a 1931 pedestrian tunnel built by the Baltimore and Ohio Railroad.

The first Boyds station was opened by the B&O for its Metropolitan Branch Railroad on May 25, 1873. The station was named after James A. Boyd, a wealthy contractor who helped build the new railroad through the area. In 1887, the B&O added a brick passenger-and-freight station designed by chief architect Ephraim Francis Baldwin. It was demolished in 1928.

== Station layout ==
The station is not compliant with the Americans with Disabilities Act of 1990, lacking raised platforms for level boarding.
