= Dickerson station =

MARC rail station in Dickerson, Maryland, US

Dickerson
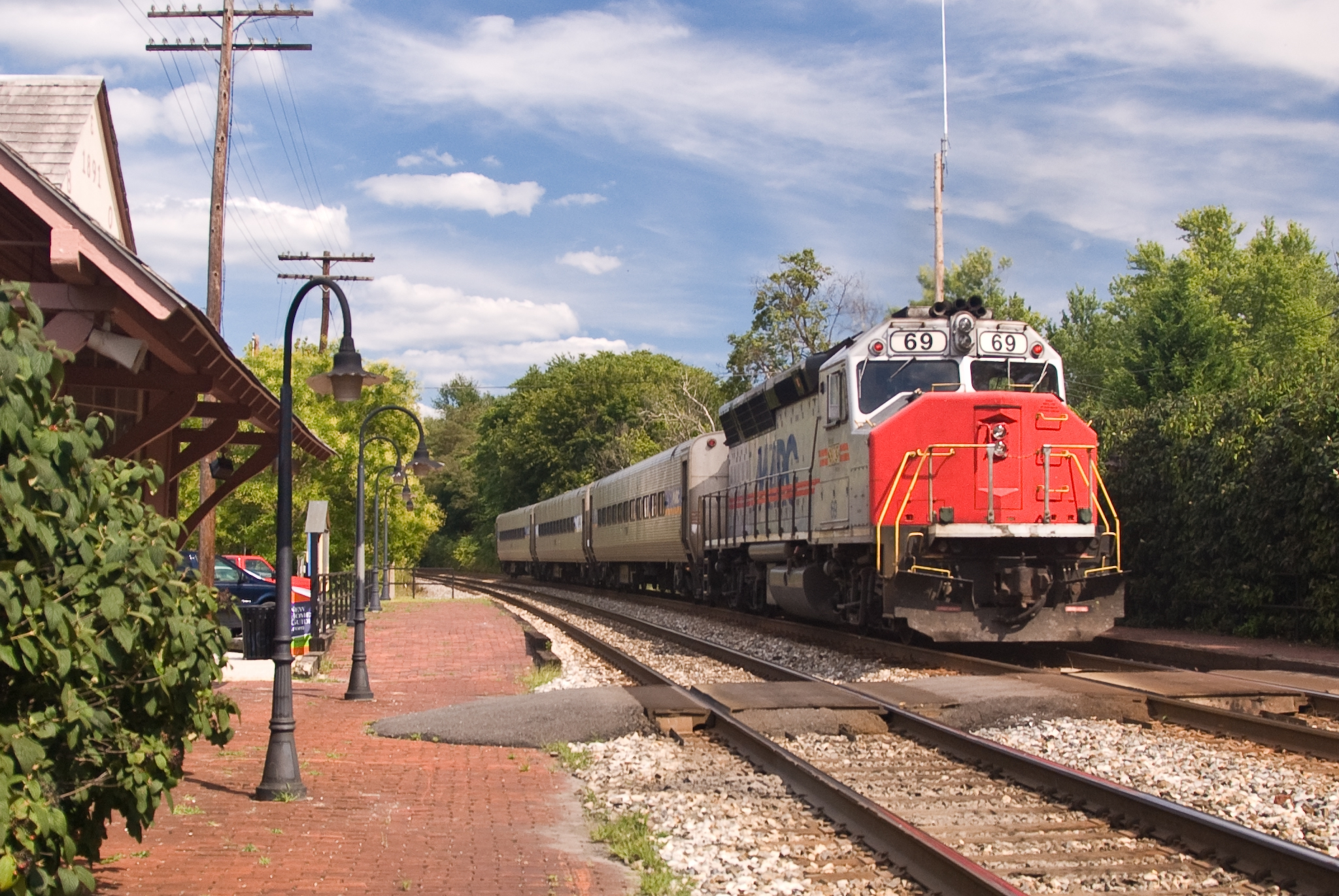

General information
- Location: 22211 Mount Ephraim Road, Dickerson, Maryland
- Coordinates: 39°13′12″N 77°25′19″W
- Line: Metropolitan Subdivision
- Platforms: 2 side platforms
- Tracks: 2

Construction
- Parking: Yes
- Accessible: No

History
- Opened: 1891

Passengers
- November 2022: 7 (daily) (MARC)

Services
Preceding station	MARC	Following station
Point of Rocks toward Martinsburg	Brunswick Line	Barnesville toward Union Station
Monocacy toward Frederick	Brunswick Line	Barnesville toward Union Station
Former services
Preceding station	Baltimore and Ohio Railroad	Following station
Point of Rocks toward Chicago	Main Line	Barnesville toward Jersey City
Tuscarora toward Chicago	Main Line	Barnesville toward Jersey City
Location

Dickerson is a passenger rail station on the MARC Brunswick Line, situated between Washington, D.C., and Martinsburg, WV (with an extension to Frederick, MD). The station was designed by E. Francis Baldwin and built by the Baltimore and Ohio Railroad in 1891. It is the last station that Frederick-bound trains pass before branching onto the Frederick Branch. It is the least used station on the MARC Brunswick Line. The station sees 4 trains a day in and outbound, and 15 parking spaces available directly adjacent to the station.

== Station layout ==
The station is not compliant with the Americans with Disabilities Act of 1990, as it lacks raised platforms for level boarding.

== See also ==
- Frederick Branch (Baltimore and Ohio Railroad)
