= Ephraim Francis Baldwin =

American architect (1837–1916)

- Born: October 4, 1837; Troy, New York, U.S.
- Died: January 20, 1916 (aged 78); Baltimore, Maryland, U.S.
- Education: Mount St. Mary's University (dropped out)
- Occupation: Architect
- Spouse: Ellen Douglas Jamison (m. 1873)
- Children: 9

Ephraim Francis Baldwin (October 4, 1837 – January 20, 1916) was an American architect, best known for his work for the Baltimore and Ohio Railroad and for the Roman Catholic Church.

== Personal life ==
Although born in Troy, New York, Baldwin lived most of his life in Baltimore, Maryland. After his father, a civil engineer, died, his mother moved to her hometown of Baltimore, where Baldwin would be educated and raised. He attended Loyola Blakefield from 1850 to 1852. He attended Mount St. Mary's University in Emmitsburg, Maryland briefly, from 1854 to 1855.

Little else is known about Baldwin's personal life. He married Ellen Douglas Jamison in 1873; they had seven sons and two daughters, and his eldest son, Francis J. Baldwin, became an architect and joined his father's firm. He was known as a devout Catholic and was a member of various Catholic societies. In 1870, he was elected a director of the newly organized Maryland Academy of Arts.

Baldwin died at his home in Baltimore in 1916. He is buried in New Cathedral Cemetery in Baltimore.

== Professional life ==
Baldwin developed a love and talent for architecture as a draftsman and apprentice in the offices of Niernsee & Neilson. His first work of any consequence was Mt. Hope Retreat (later the Seton Institute, now demolished) in Baltimore. He left Niernsee & Neilson in 1867 and practiced on his own for two years. In 1869, Baldwin entered into a partnership with Bruce Price, whom he had met as a trainee at Niernsee & Neilson. They are credited with designing 10 East Chase Street, Baltimore, Maryland, in about 1870. The partnership of Baldwin & Price was short-lived: in 1873, Price moved to Wilkes-Barre, Pennsylvania. During the next ten years, Baldwin practiced alone. In 1883, he entered in a long and fruitful partnership with Josias Pennington, who had been a draftsman at Baldwin & Price, and they formed the firm Baldwin & Pennington.

Baldwin and Price were elected to membership in the Baltimore Chapter of the American Institute of Architects (AIA) in December 1870. Baldwin served as a Secretary of the Chapter until his resignation in 1888 over a disagreement between himself and a competitor, George A. Frederick, another well-known local architect and municipal engineer/architect, designer among many projects of the Baltimore City Hall (1867–1875) and several structures at the city's new expansive Druid Hill Park purchased 1860.

== Career highlights ==
Over the course of his fifty-year career, Baldwin designed some 500 churches, banks, office buildings, warehouses, railroad stations, municipal and public buildings, hospitals, schools, clubs, and residences. His work can be found from New York to Ohio, and from Pennsylvania to Georgia, though eighty percent of his work can be found in Maryland. About 150 of those buildings still stand.

=== Railroad structures ===
In 1872, Baldwin was appointed the head architect for the Baltimore and Ohio Railroad, a position previously held by John Rudolph Niernsee, his mentor. Over the next 25 years, he designed stations and other structures for the railroad, including many of its most famous buildings. Perhaps the best known are the passenger and freight car shops at Mount Clare Shops established in 1829 by the railroad at its beginnings in 1829 in southwest Baltimore that includes his 1884 central roundhouse at the current B&O Railroad Museum (established 1953), the B&O passenger station (1875) at Point of Rocks, Maryland and the immensely long Baltimore & Ohio Warehouse at Camden Yards, built in 1905 adjacent to Camden Street Station (now at the Camden Yards sports stadiums complex in downtown Baltimore. Other surviving Baldwin stations can be found in:

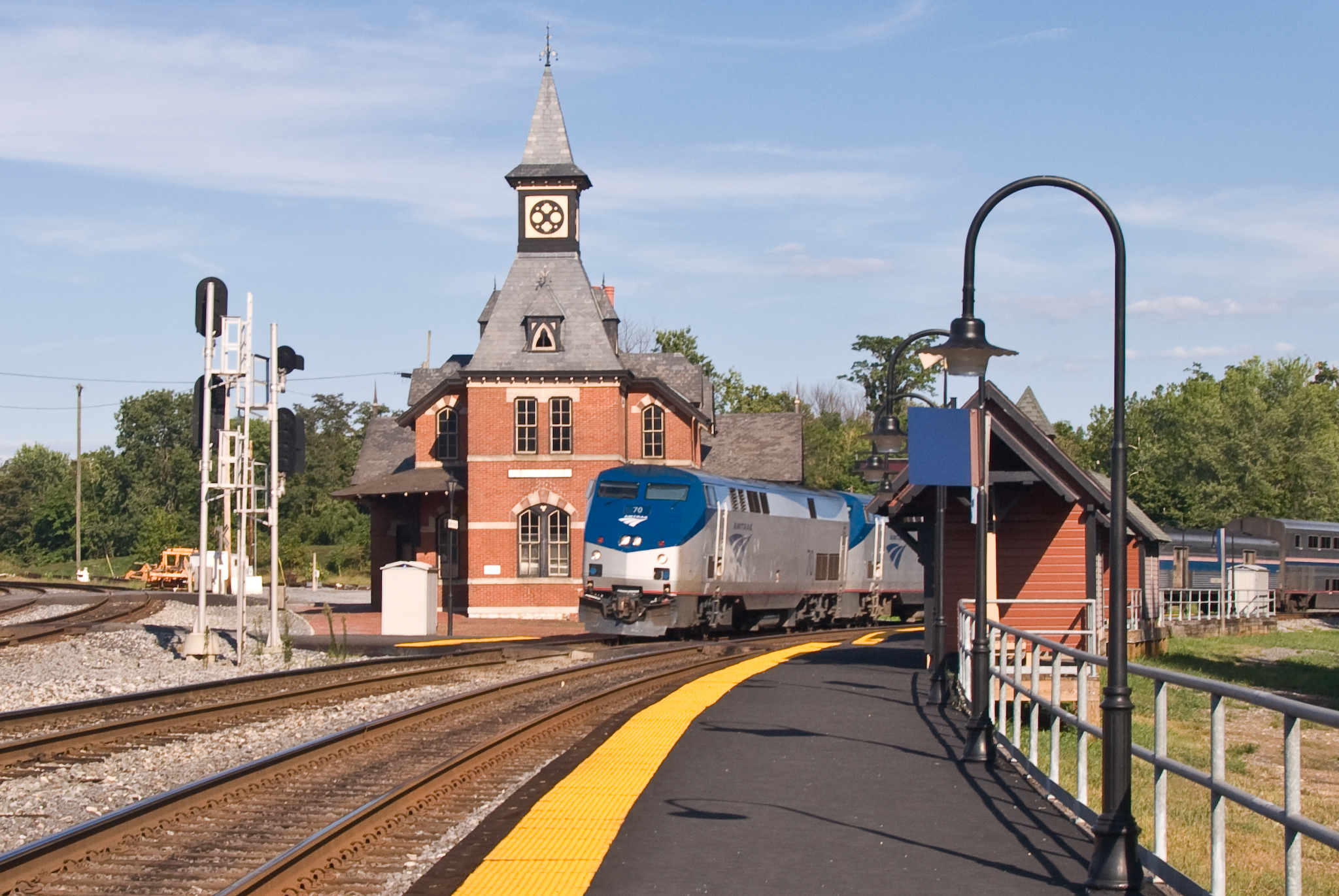
B&O station at Point of Rocks, Maryland, designed by E.F. Baldwin, built 1873.

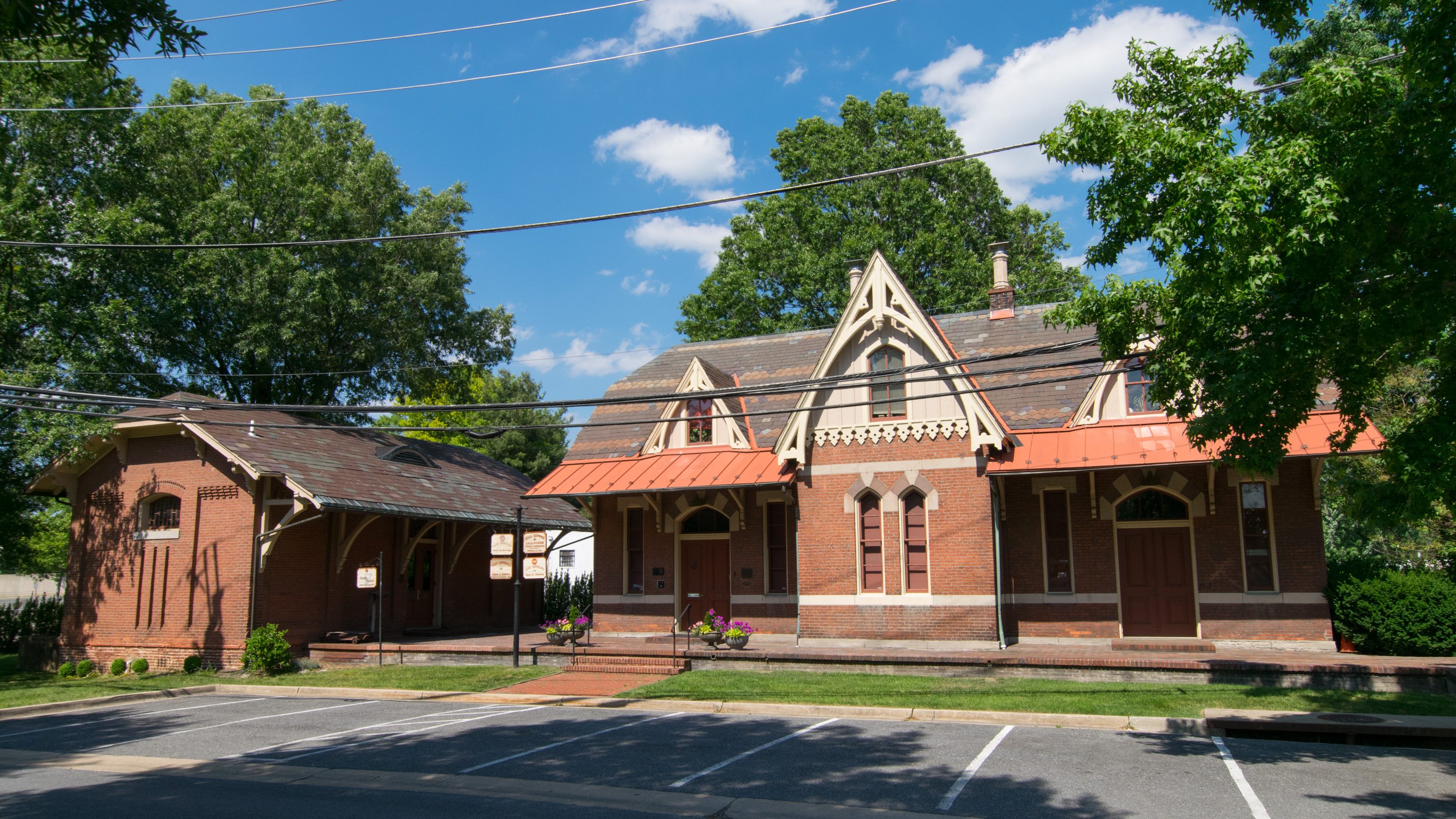
B&O Station Rockville, Maryland

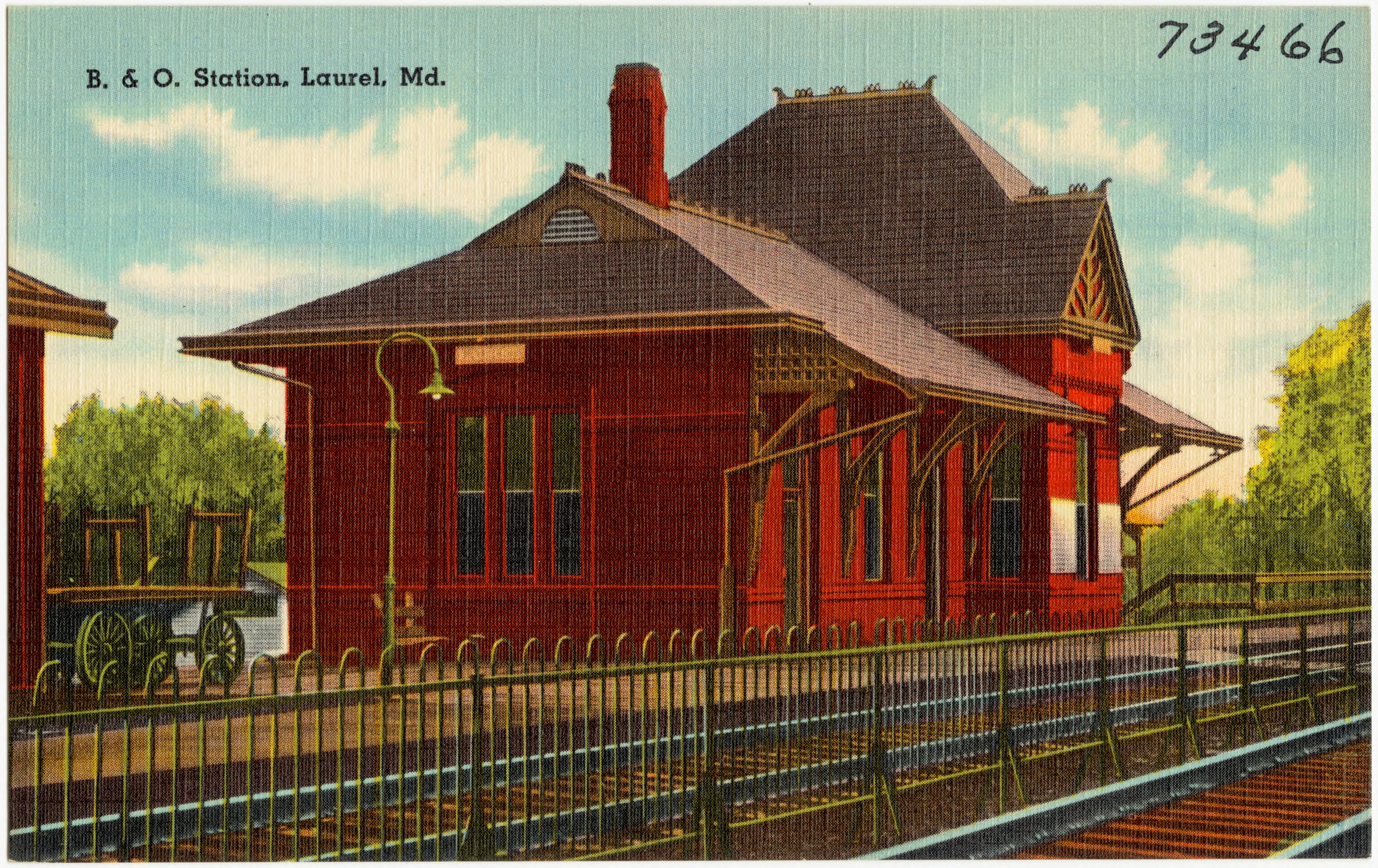
B&O Station Laurel, Maryland

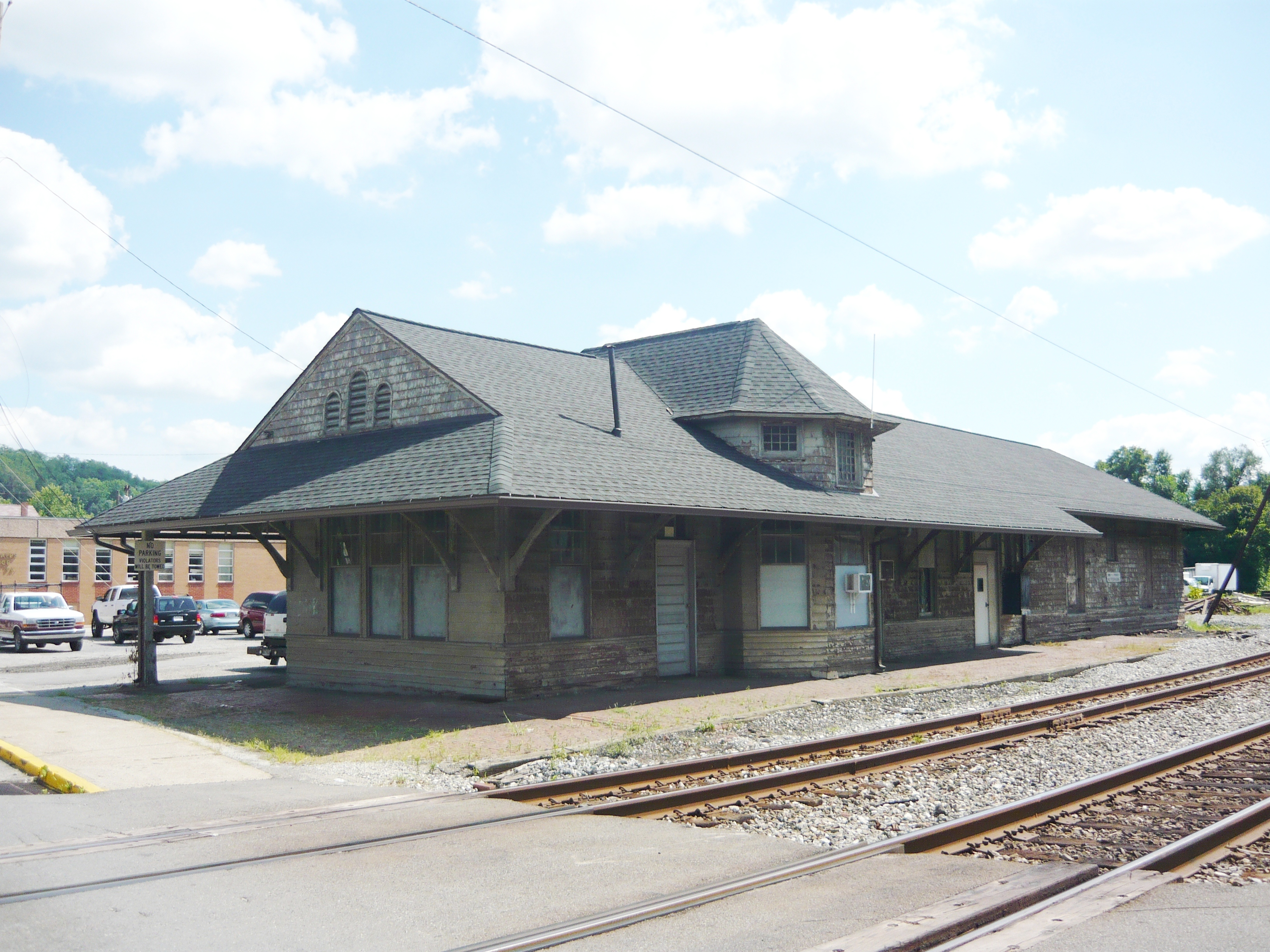
B&O Station West Newton, Pennsylvania

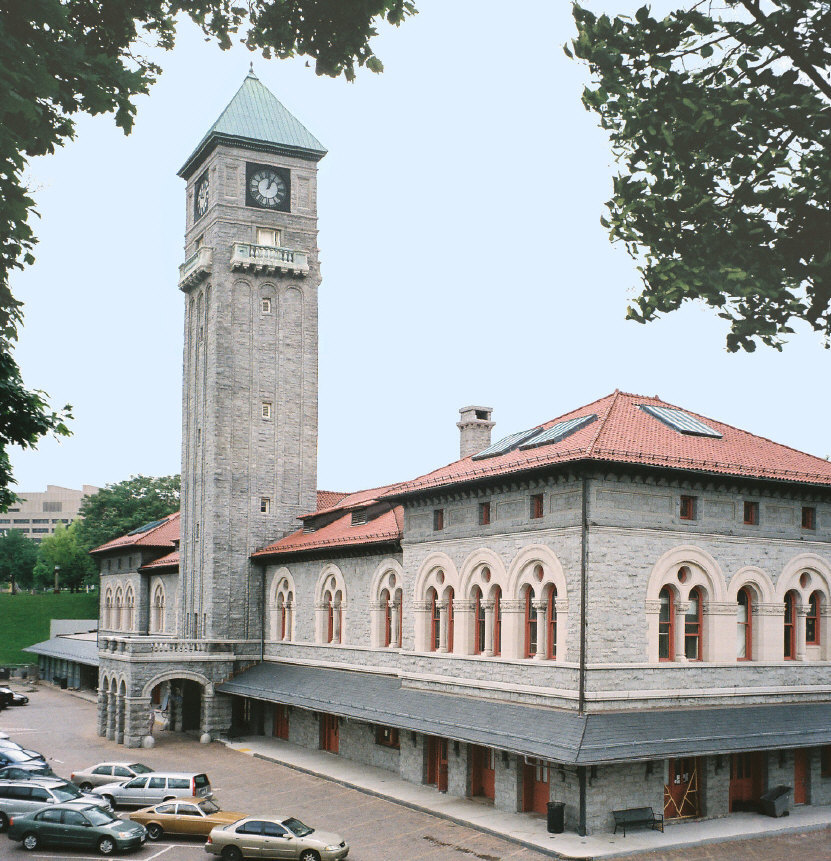
Mount Royal Station, Baltimore, Maryland

- Rockville, Maryland (1873). Moved and converted to law offices. NRHP 74000961
- Keyser, West Virginia (1875), a brick station built in 1875.
- Mount Airy, Maryland (1876).
- Hancock, West Virginia (1876), known as Brosius Station, after the original name of its location.
- Baltimore and Ohio Railroad company offices, Baltimore, Maryland
- Paw Paw, West Virginia (1882)
- Lexington, Virginia (1883). Moved, currently the headquarters of Omicron Delta Kappa leadership honor society
- Mountain Lake Park, Maryland (1884), a large wooden station.
- Laurel, Maryland. The Laurel Railroad Station (1884) was added to the National Register of Historic Places in 1973. NRHP 73002165
- Gaithersburg, Maryland (1884). The Gaithersburg B&O Railroad Station and Freight Shed was added to the National Register of Historic Places in 1978. NRHP 78001473
- Sykesville, Maryland (1884) was made into a notable model railroad kit.
- Morgantown, West Virginia (1884), much modified, currently a visitor center.
- Oakland, Maryland (1885) NRHP 74000953
- Homeland, Baltimore, Maryland (1888) station built for the Maryland Central Railway, now a private residence.
- Germantown, Maryland is a reconstruction; the original (1891) was destroyed by arson in 1978.
- Kensington, Maryland (1891) NRHP 80001827
- Dickerson, Maryland (1891); heavily damaged by fire in the late 1970s/early 1980s, it was extensively rebuilt.
- Frostburg, Maryland (1891), a wooden station built for the Cumberland and Pennsylvania Railroad in 1891.
- Brunswick, Maryland (1892) part of the Brunswick Historic District.
- New Oxford, Pennsylvania (1892), built for the Western Maryland Railway, currently a museum.
- Washington, Pennsylvania (1892)
- Weston, West Virginia (1892), in use as a municipal building.
- Winchester, Virginia (1892). Stone exterior; currently the headquarters of the small Winchester and Western Railroad.
- West Newton, Pennsylvania (1893)
- Mount Royal Station (1896), Baltimore, Maryland. NRHP 73002191
- Harpers Ferry, West Virginia (1896) was moved from its original location in the 1930s and later had its control tower removed. It was restored in 2007 and the tower was rebuilt. It was officially re-dedicated on Saturday, April 28, 2007. NRHP 79002584
- Piedmont, West Virginia survives in a modified form, including removal of a top floor.

Several other non-passenger buildings survive including freight stations in Ellicott City, Maryland and Martinsburg, West Virginia

Baldwin's stations are a favorite with photographers because of their picturesque appearance. Built of brick or wood in the Queen Anne Style, the most famous are festooned with decorative gables, spires, and brickwork.

=== Roman Catholic Church and institutions ===
The Roman Catholic Church was also a major part of his life and work. Baldwin took a special interest in ecclesiastical work, undoubtedly motivated by his own religious beliefs and dedication. His work on numerous churches, seminaries, schools, and health care facilities spanned his entire career. He was awarded a gold medal, Bene Merenti, by Pope Leo XII for his work on the buildings at The Catholic University of America in Washington, D.C.

Among his many other churches and Catholic buildings are the following:

- The Shrine of the Sacred Heart, Mount Washington, Baltimore (He was a parishioner here)
- Cathedral of St. John the Baptist in Savannah, Georgia (1876)
- St. Ann's Church on Greenmount Avenue in East Baltimore
- St. Leo's Church in the Little Italy neighborhood of East Baltimore (1881)
- Church of St. John the Evangelist in Forest Glen, Maryland
- Theresa Hall at the College of Notre Dame of Maryland on North Charles Street in north Baltimore
- Buildings at St. Mary's Seminary and University, then on North Paca Street, in Seton Hill neighborhood in west Baltimore
- Caldwell Hall, Catholic University of America in Washington, D.C.
- McMahon Hall, Catholic University of America in Washington, DC
- The Baltimore City College (public boys high school - second building on site), at North Howard and West Centre Streets, Mt. Vernon-Belvedere neighborhood, westside Baltimore (1893–1895)

=== Commercial and other buildings ===
- Hutzler Brothers Palace Building, on North Howard Street, westside downtown Baltimore (1888)
- Merchants' National Bank Building, Baltimore (1895)
- Masonic Temple, Fairmont, West Virginia (1907)

== See also ==
- Bruce Price

== Gallery ==
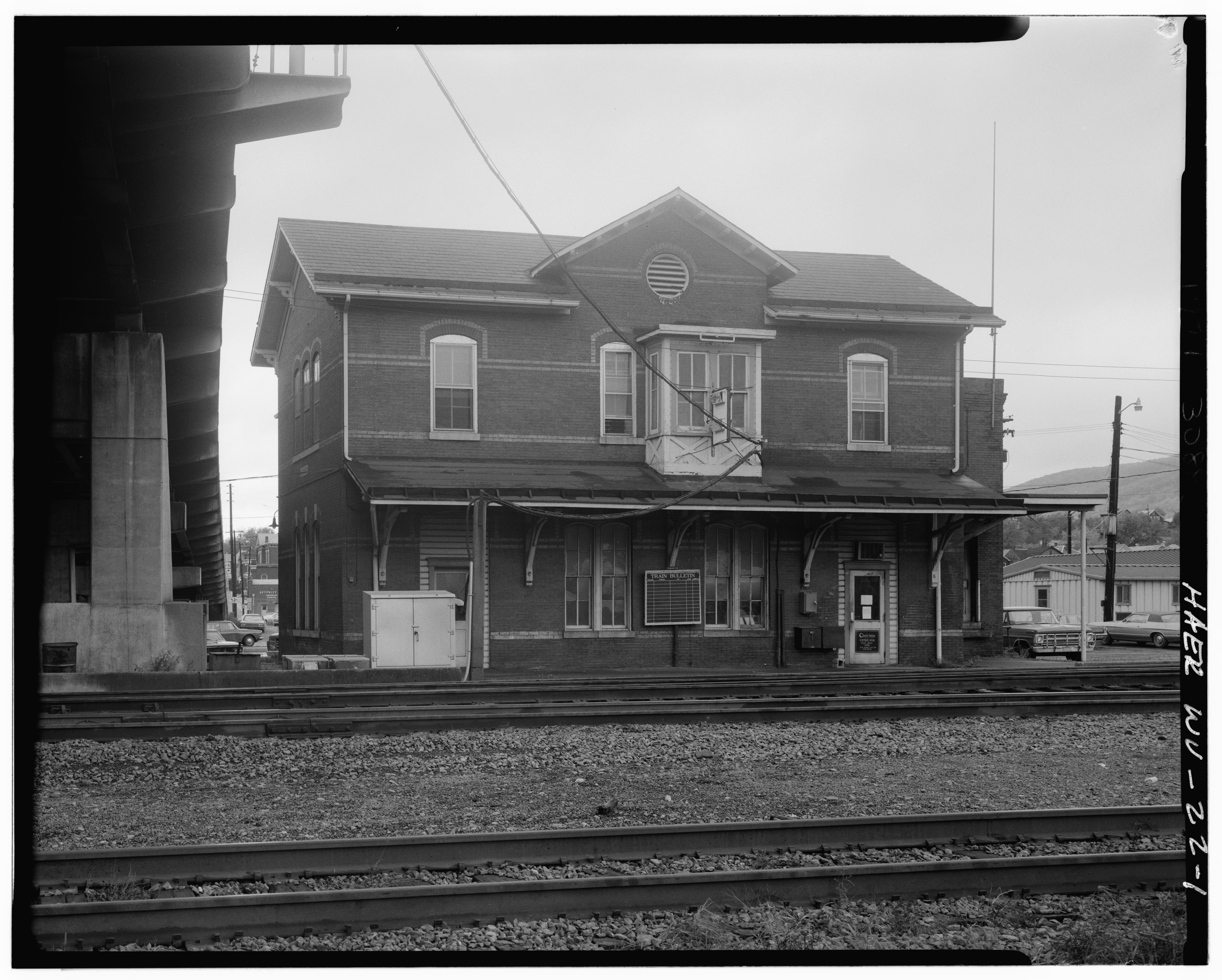
Baltimore & Ohio Railroad station, Keyser, West Virginia

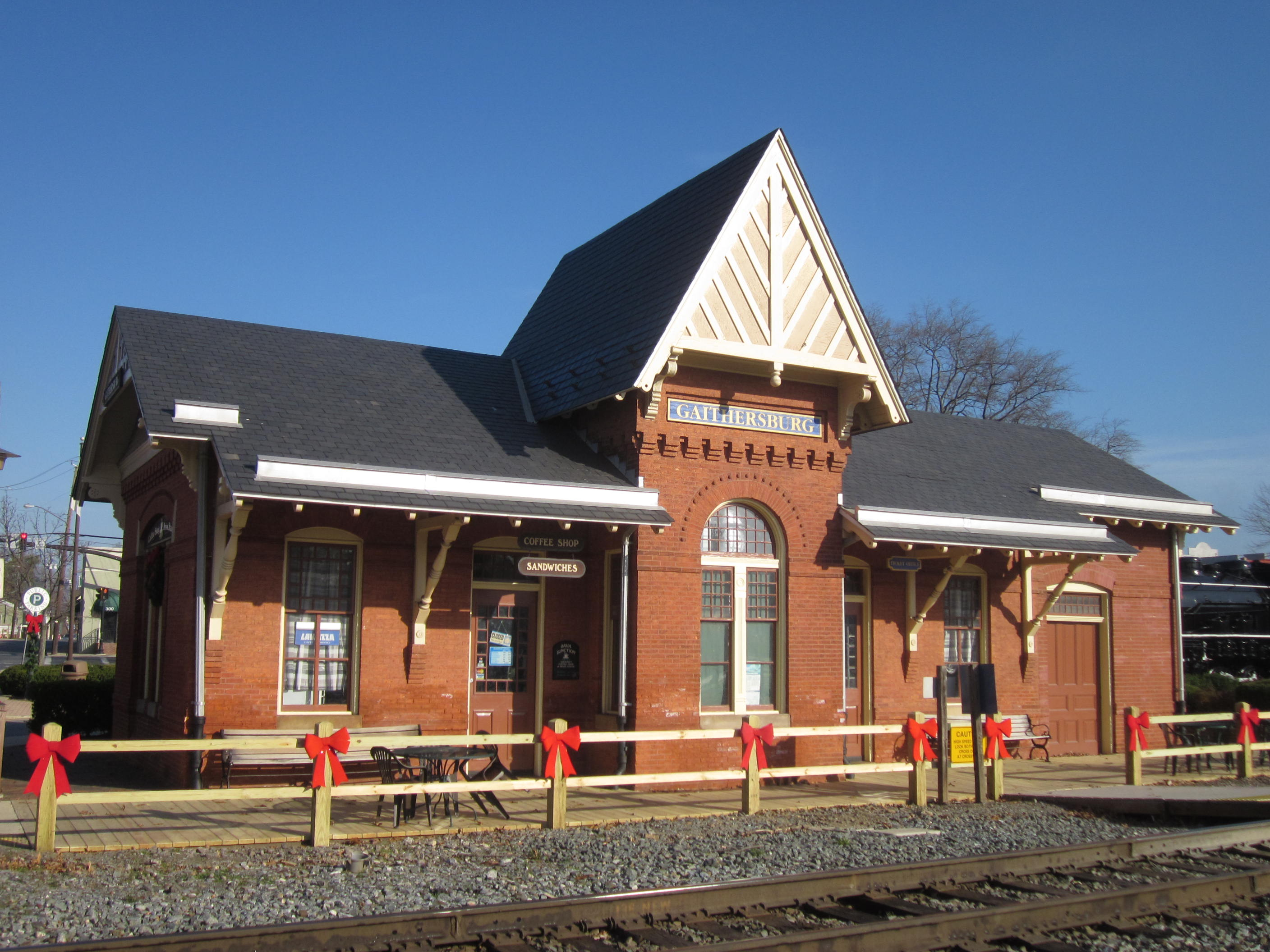
Baltimore & Ohio Railroad (now MARC) station, Gaithersburg, Maryland

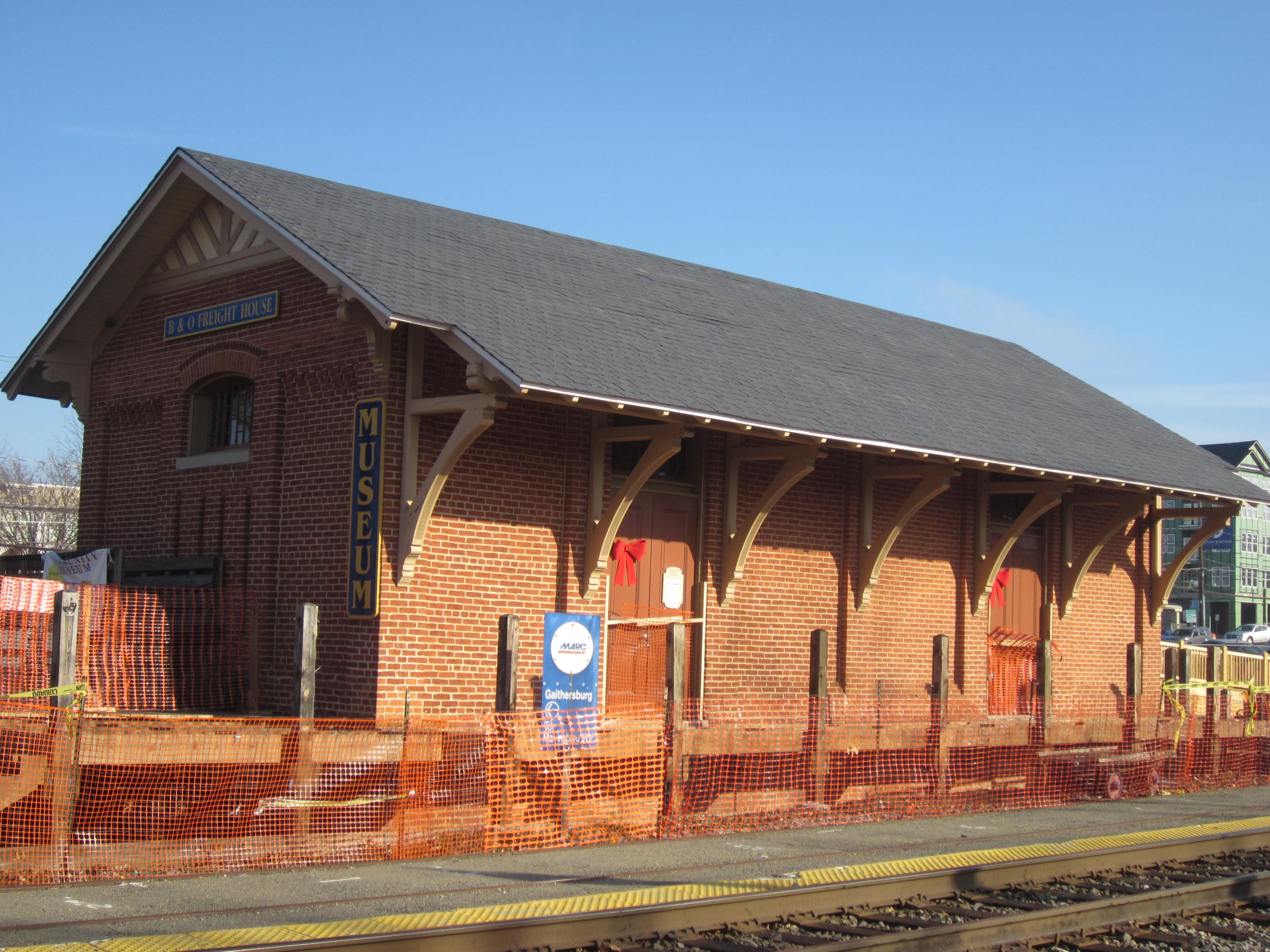
Baltimore & Ohio Railroad freight house, Gaithersburg, Maryland

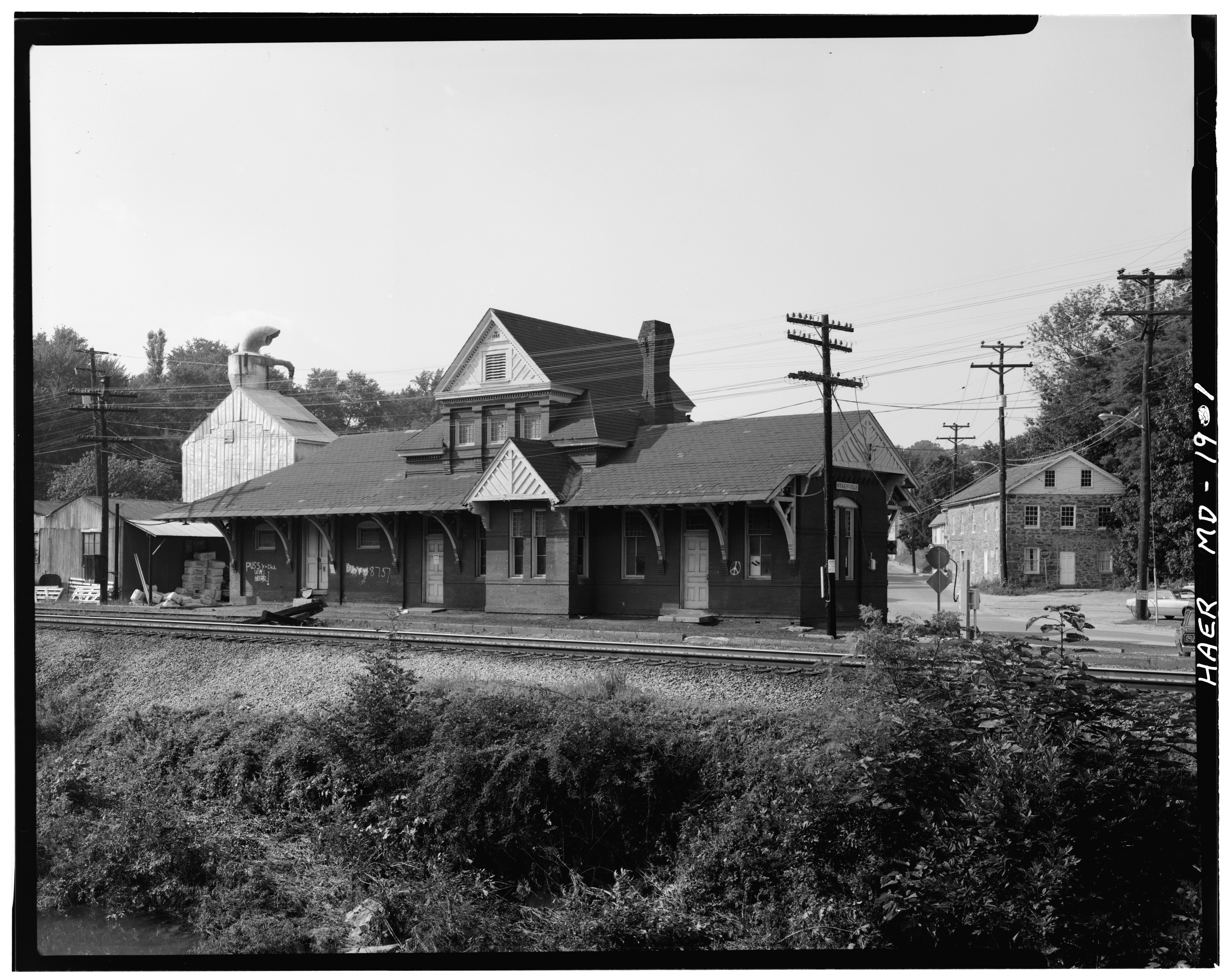
Baltimore & Ohio Railroad station, Sykesville, Maryland

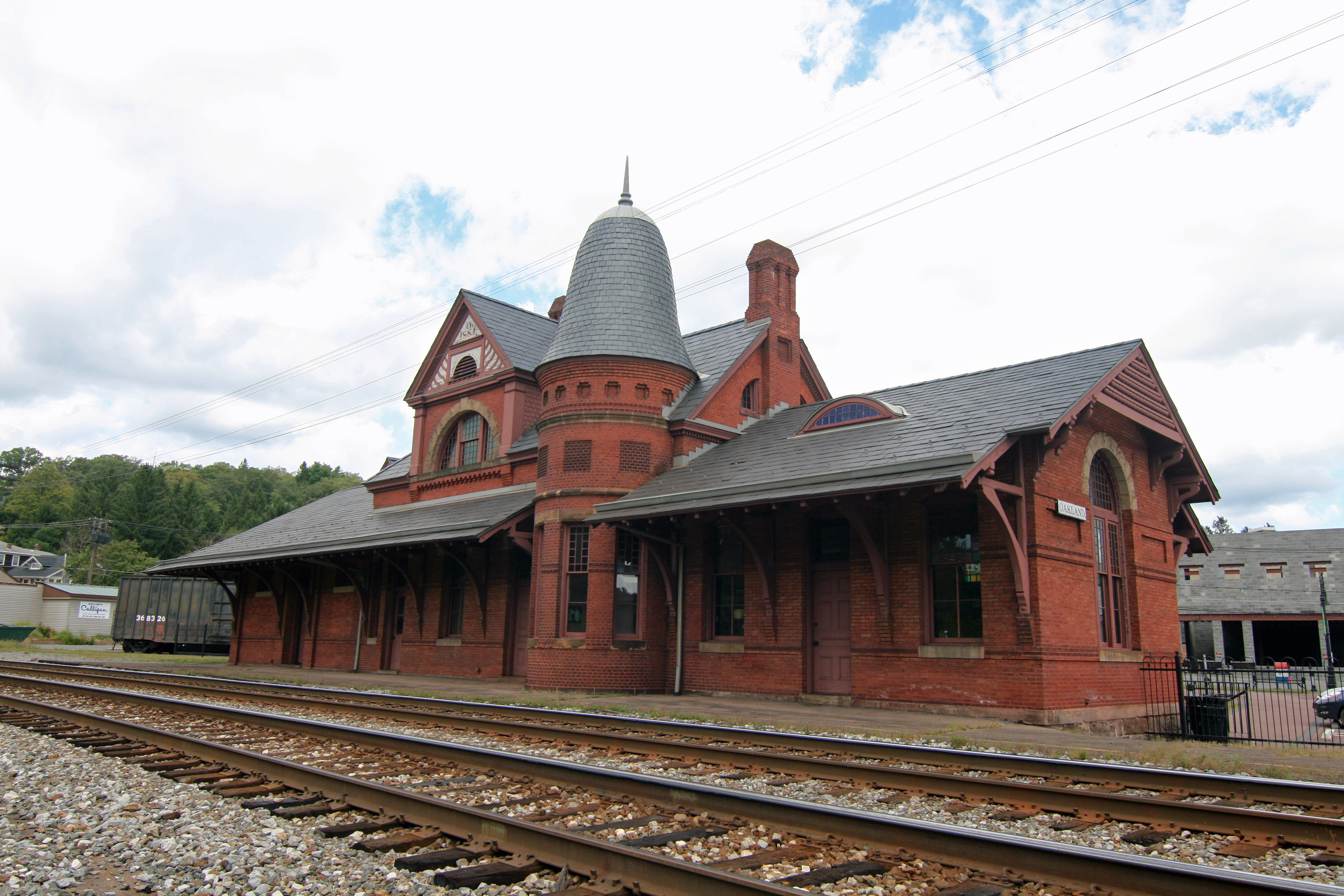
Baltimore & Ohio Railroad station, Oakland, Maryland

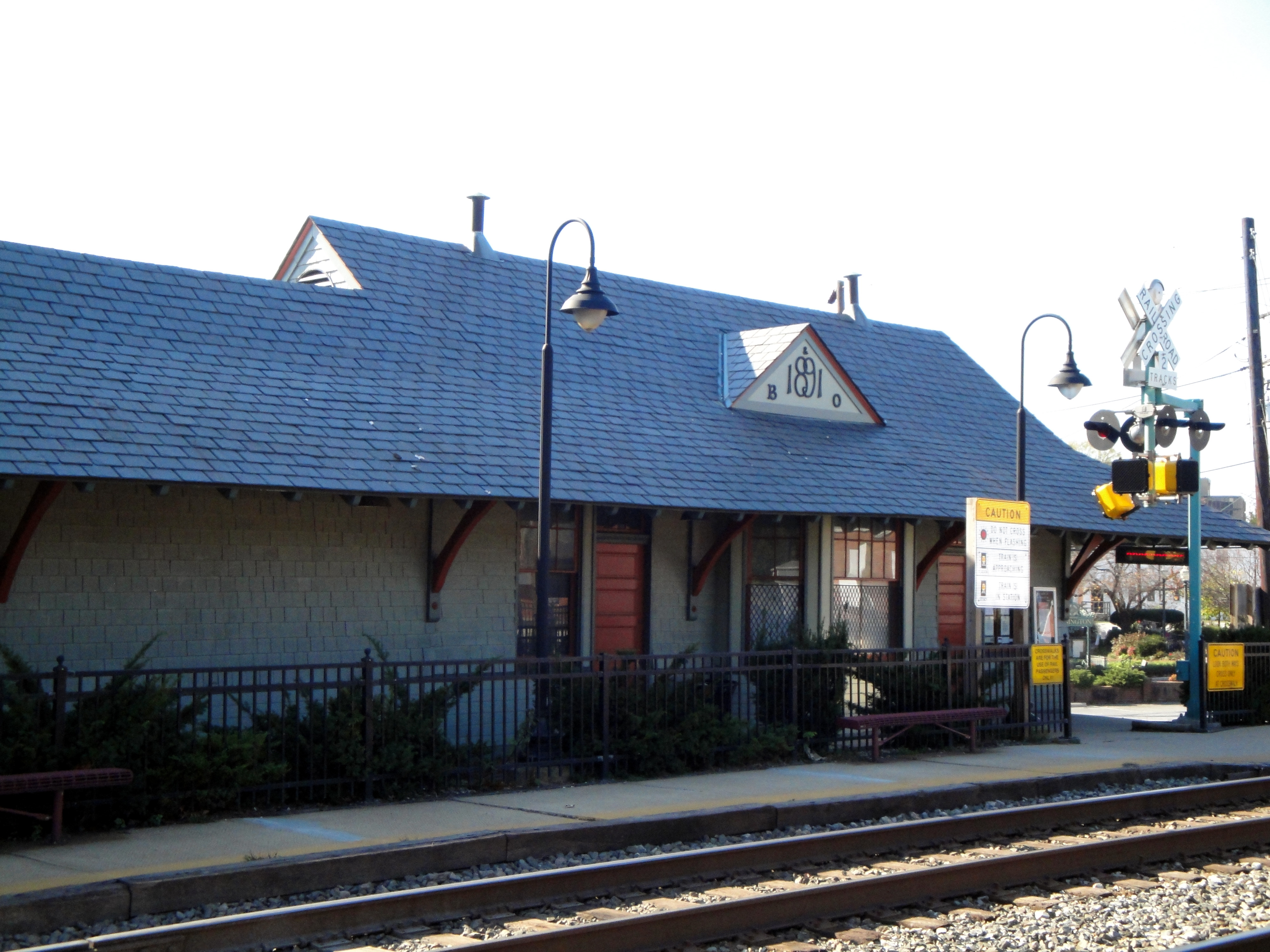
Baltimore & Ohio Railroad (now MARC) station, Kensington, Maryland

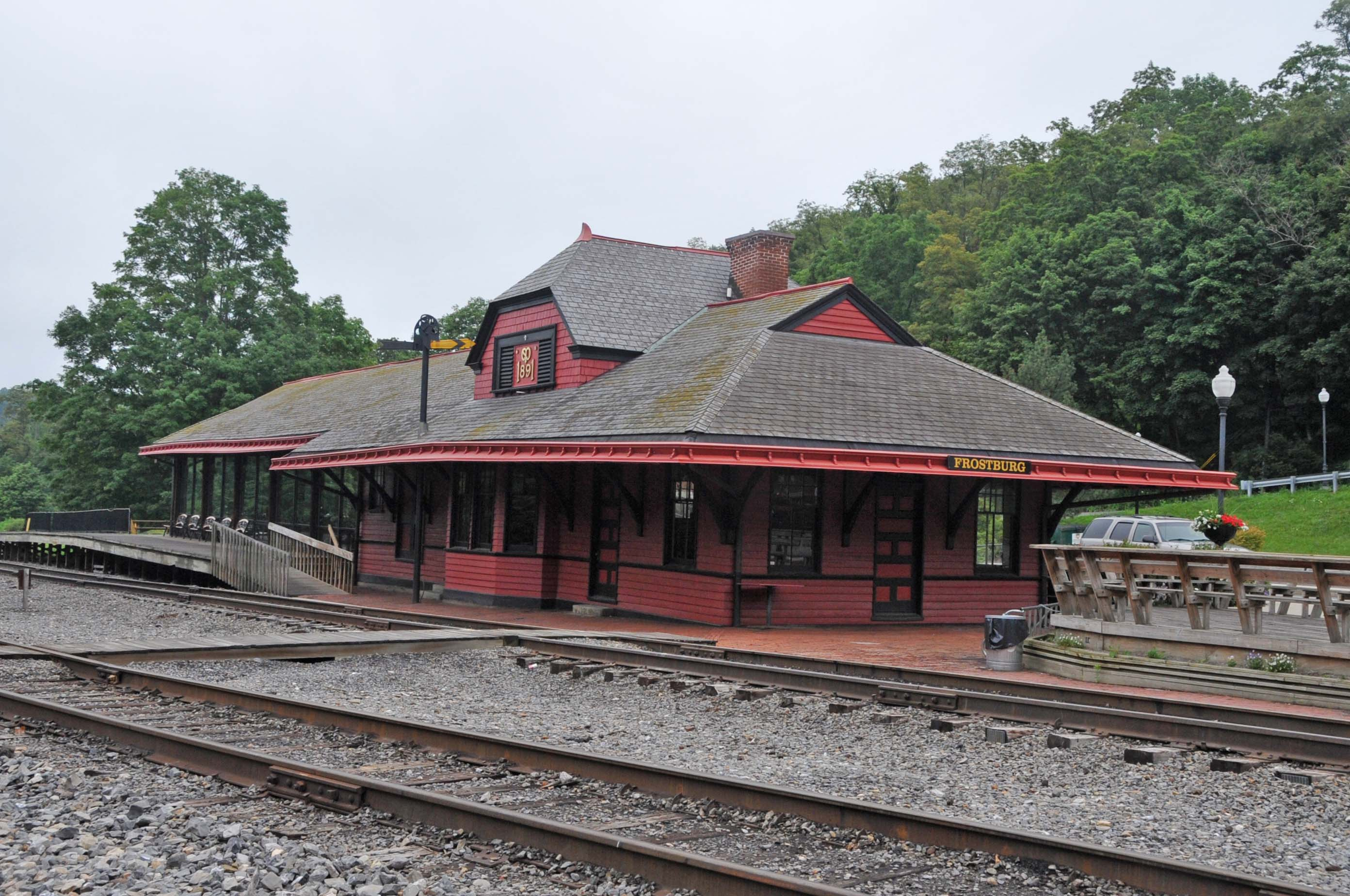
Cumberland & Pennsylvania Railroad (now Western Maryland Scenic Railroad), Frostburg, Maryland

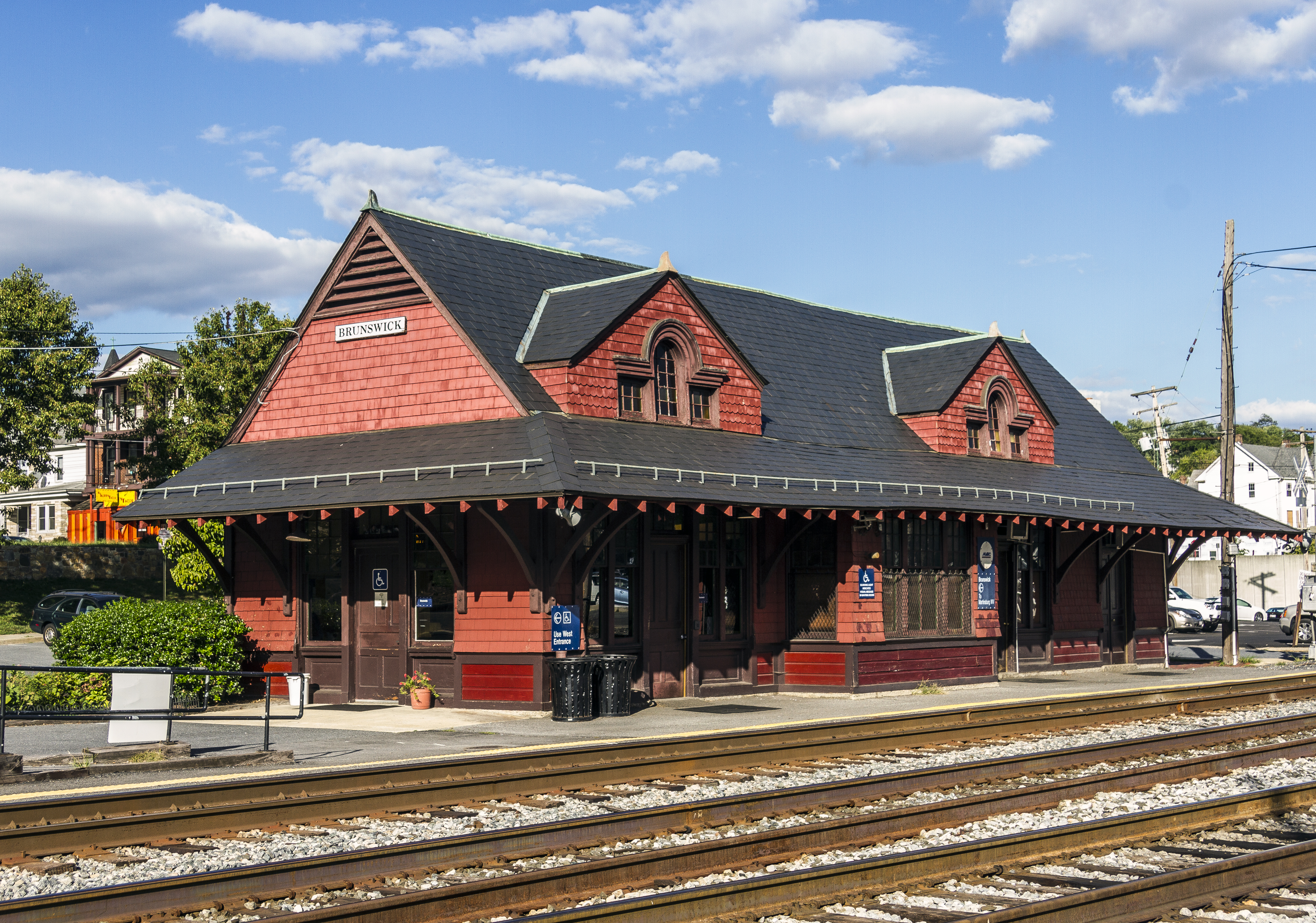
Baltimore & Ohio Railroad (now MARC) station, Brunswick, Maryland

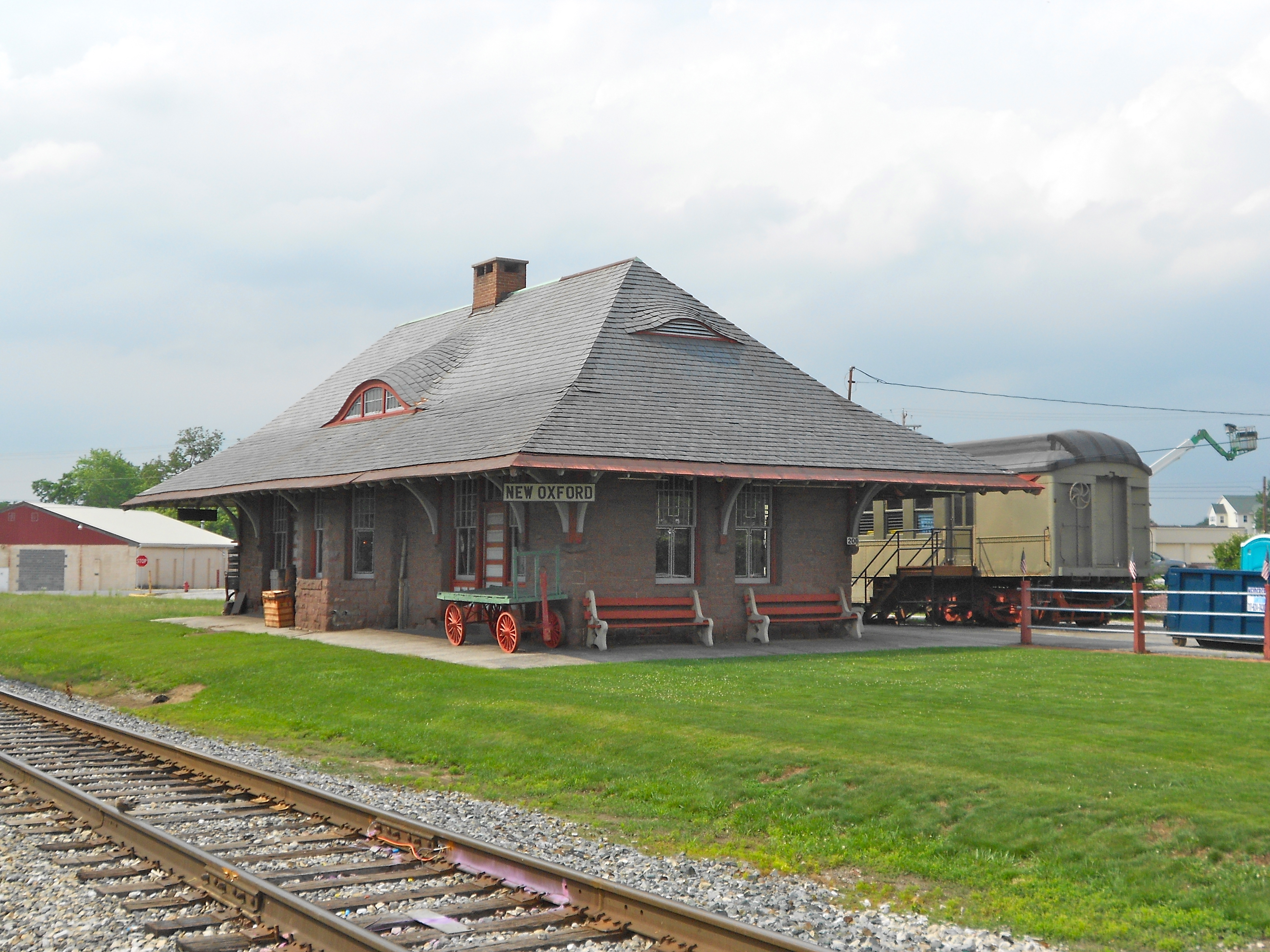
Western Maryland Railroad station, New Oxford, Pennsylvania

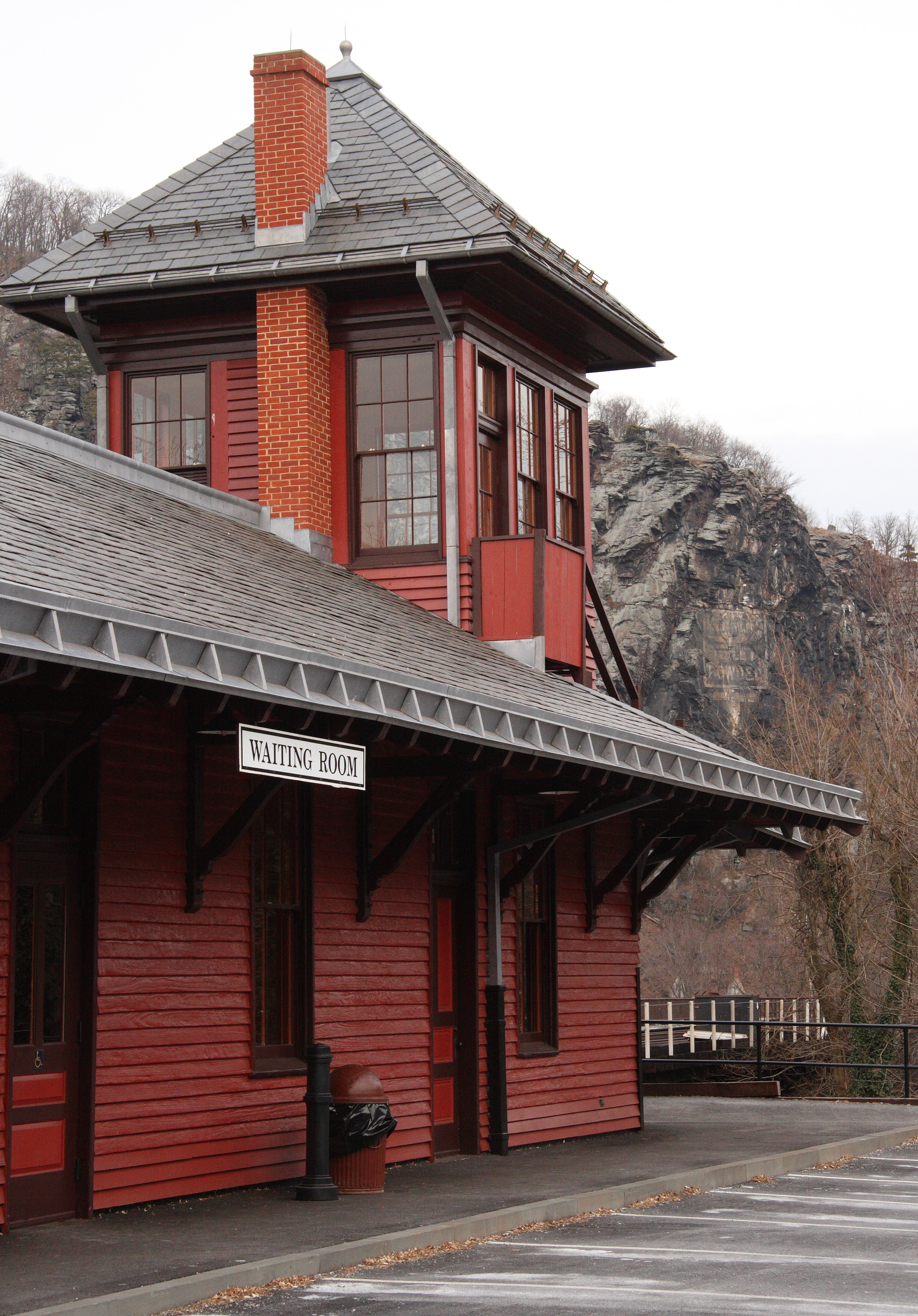
Baltimore & Ohio Railroad (now Amtrak) station, Harpers Ferry, West Virginia

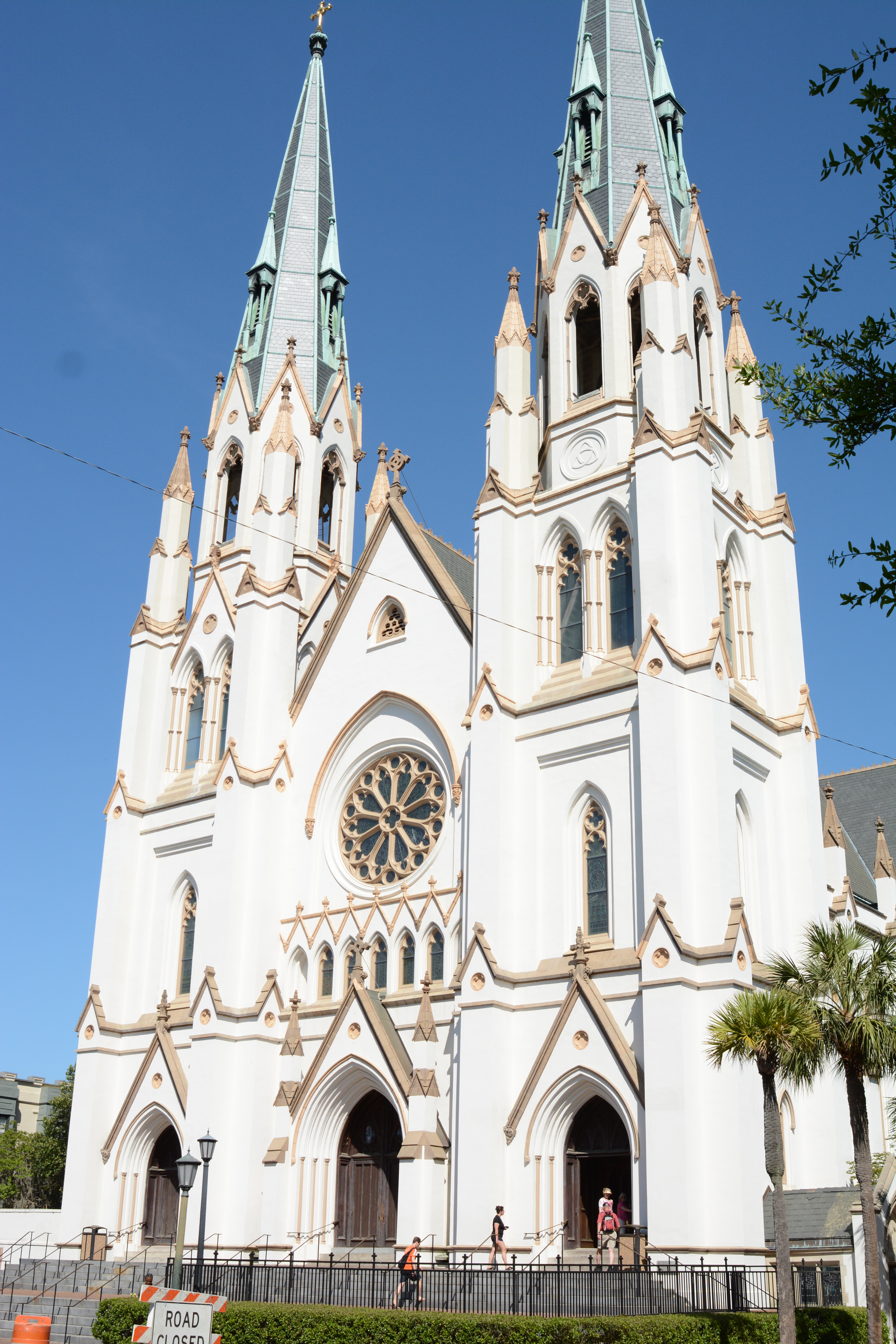
Cathedral of St. John the Baptist, Savannah, Georgia

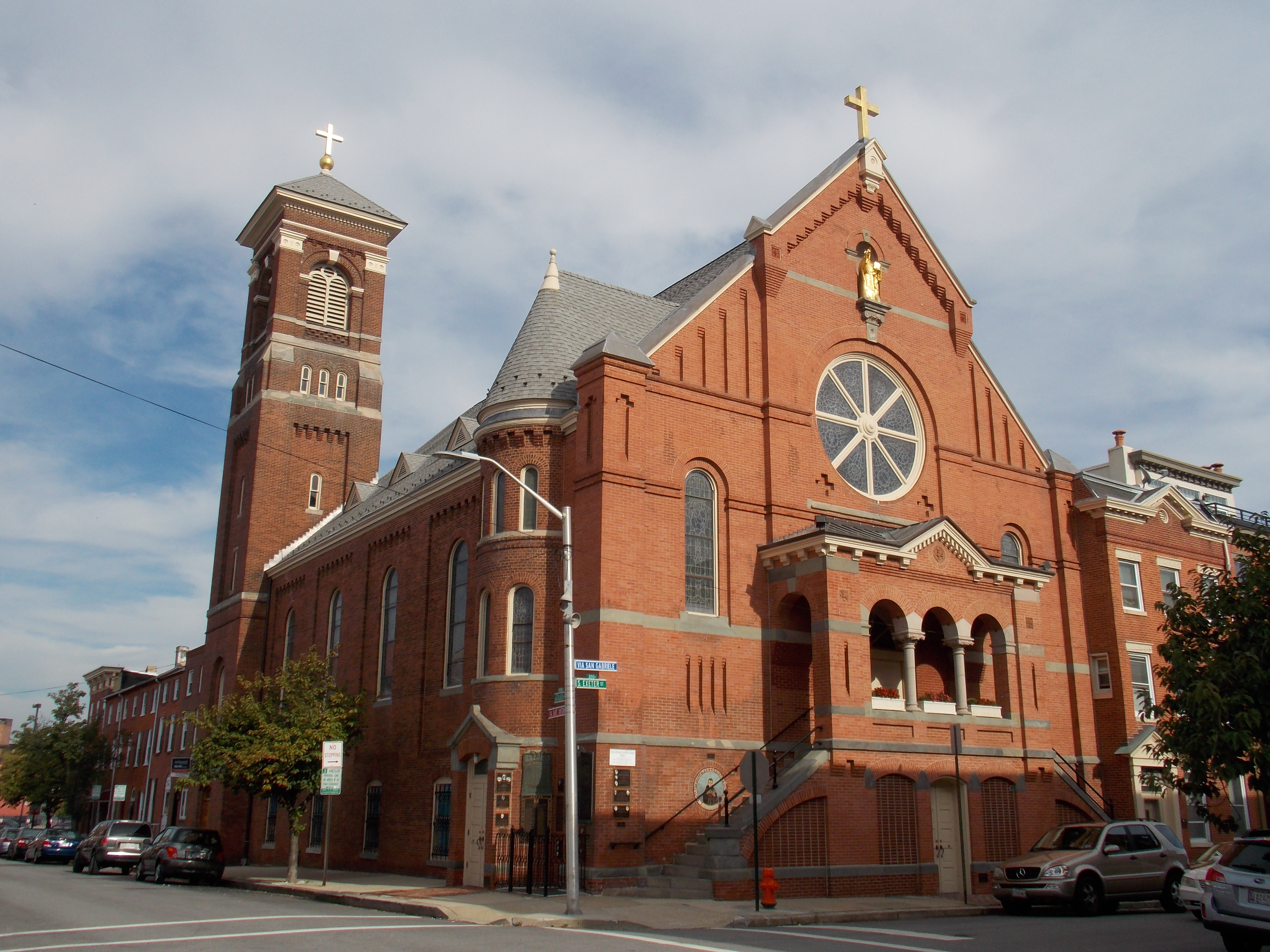
St. Leo's Church, Baltimore, Maryland

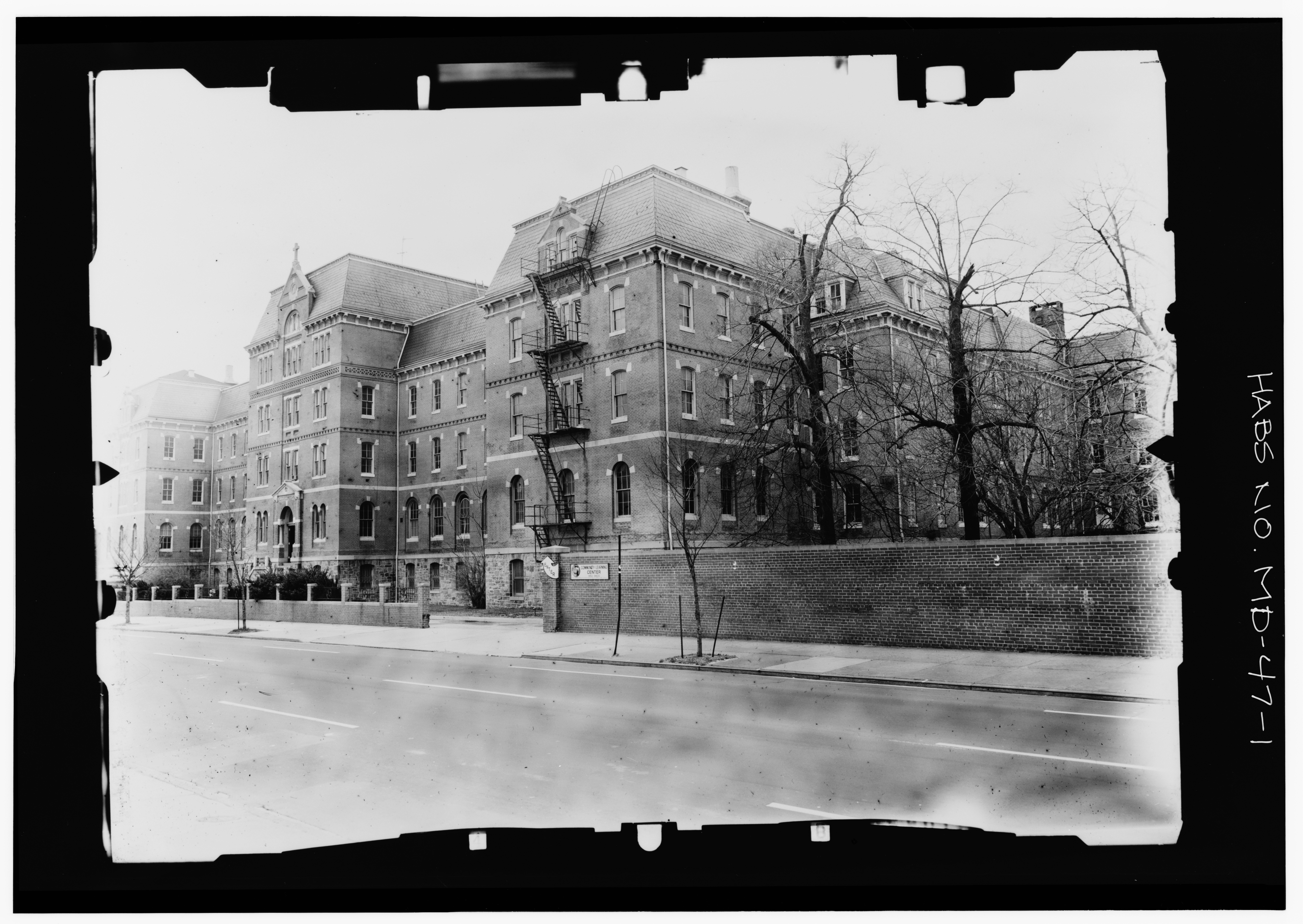
St. Mary's Seminary, Baltimore, Maryland

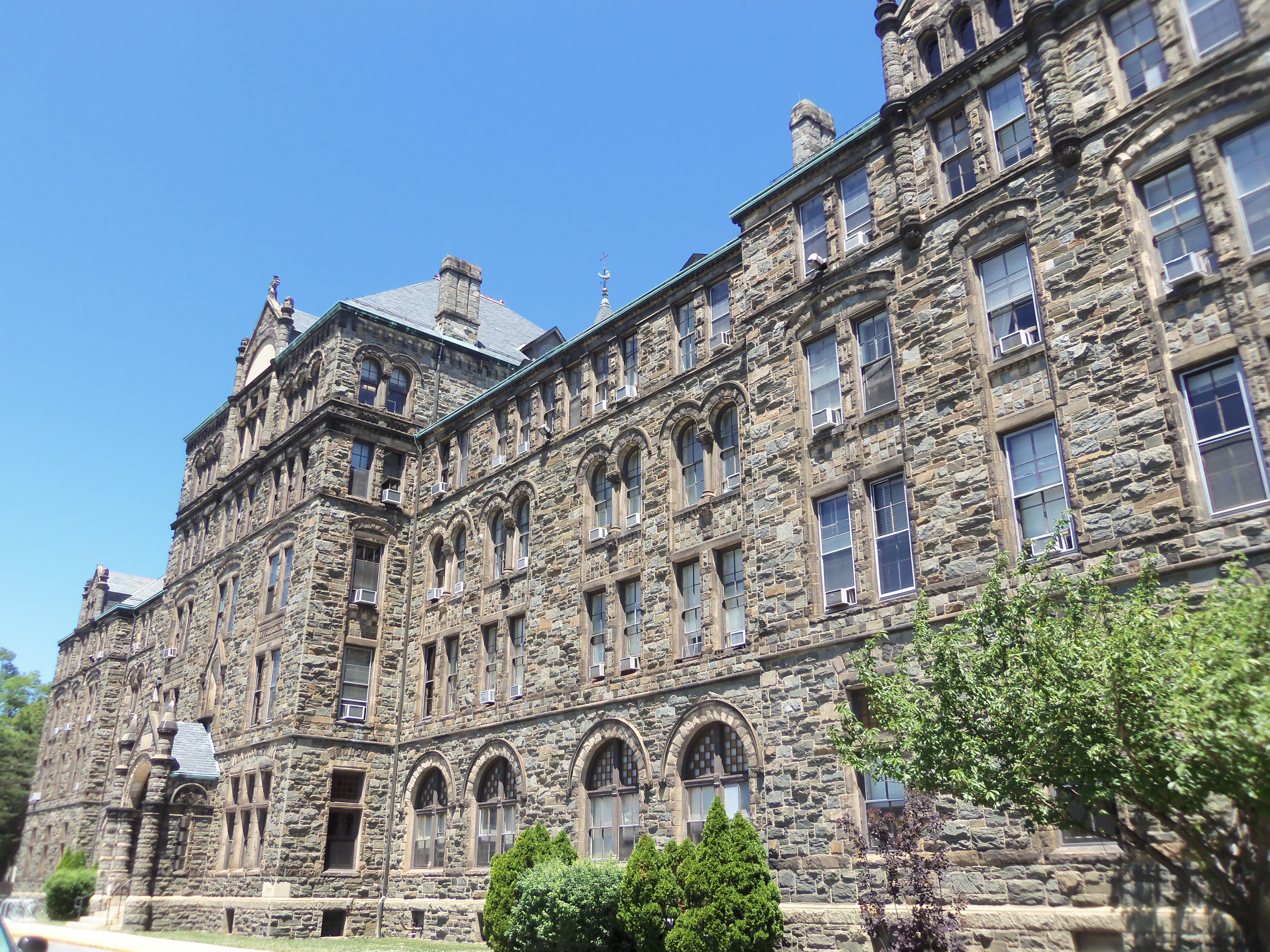
Caldwell Hall, Catholic University, Washington, District of Columbia

McMahon Hall, Catholic University, Washington, District of Columbia

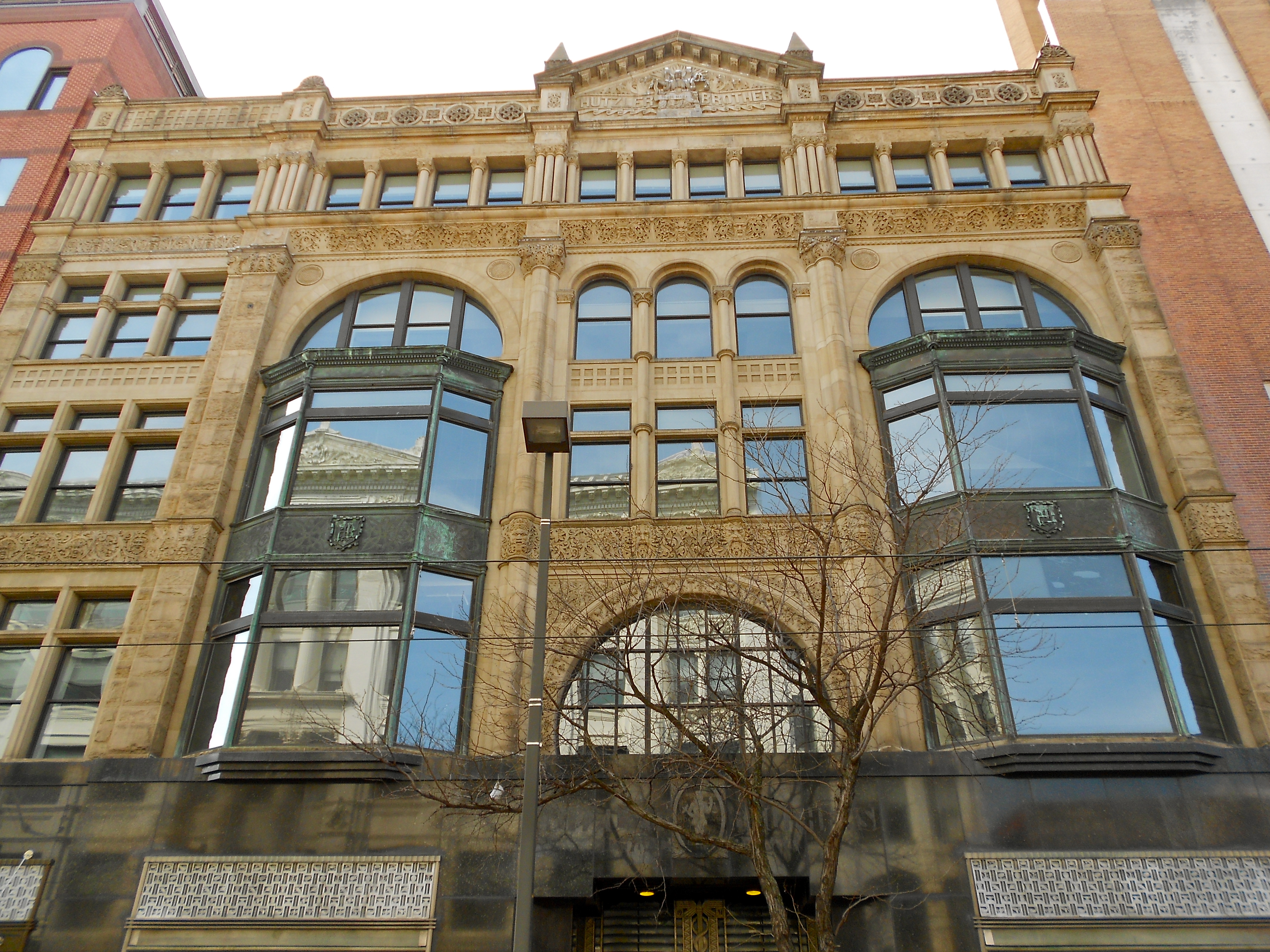
Hutzler Palace Building, Baltimore, Maryland

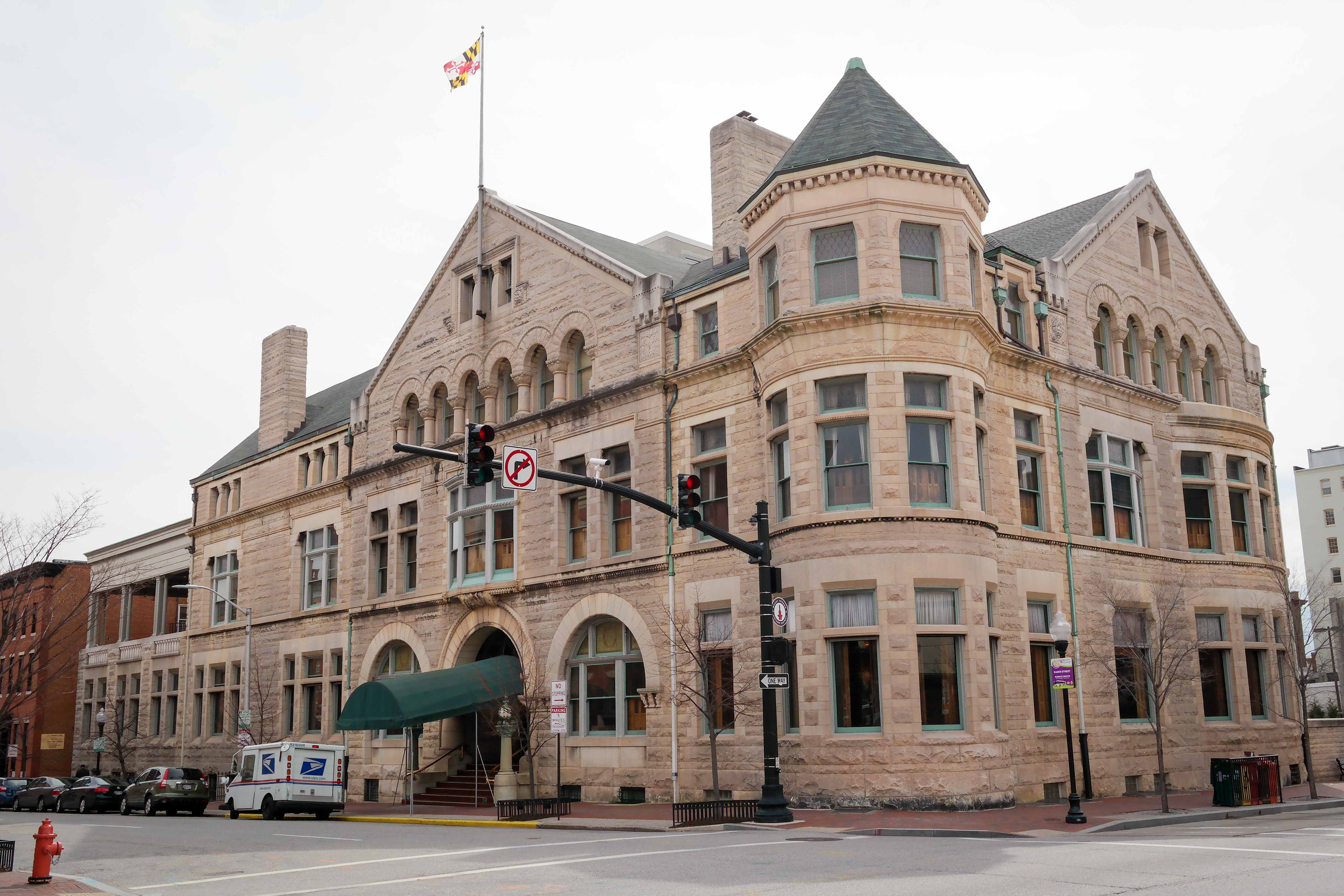
Maryland Club, Maryland, Baltimore

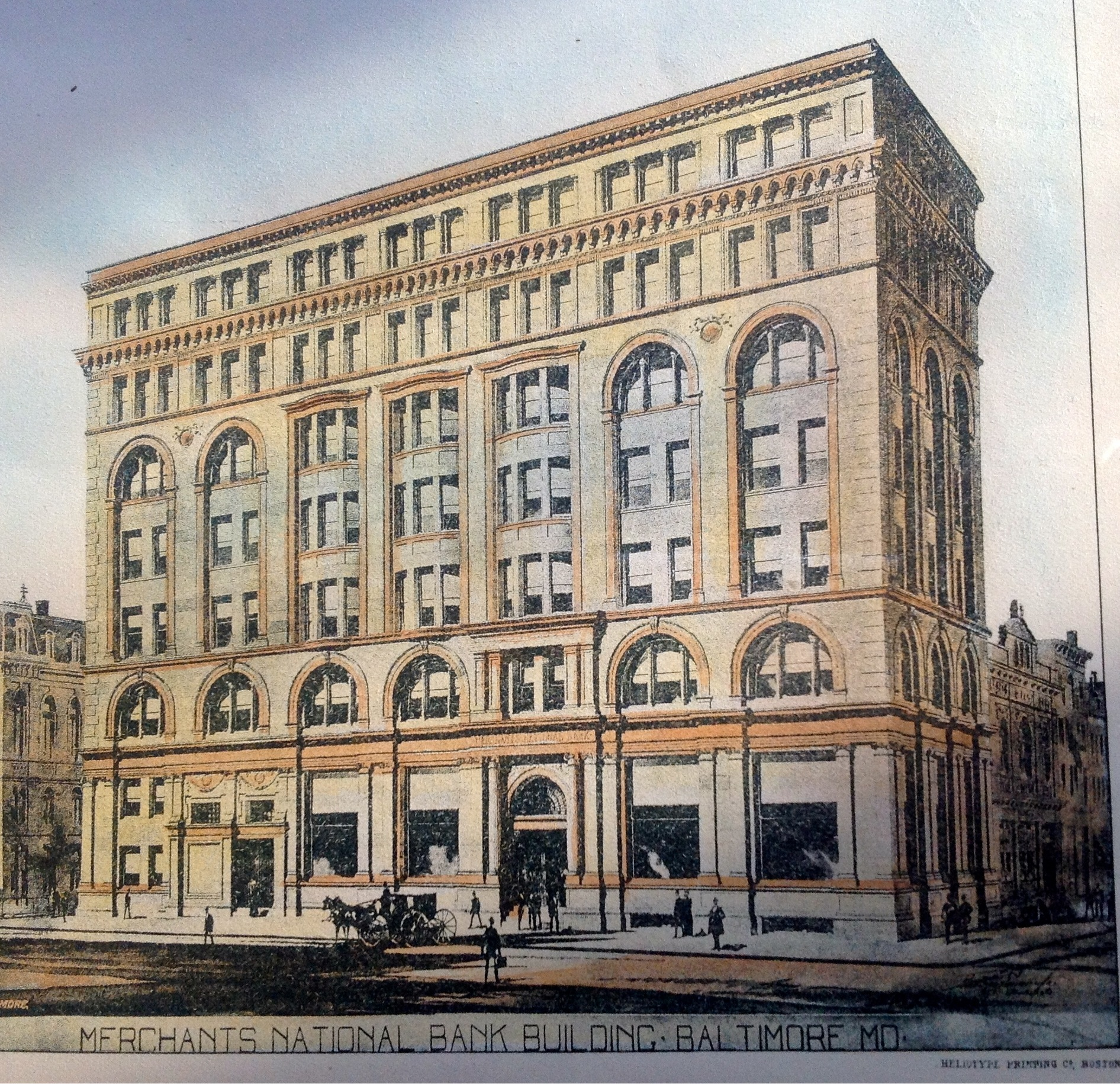
Merchants National Bank Building, Baltimore, Maryland

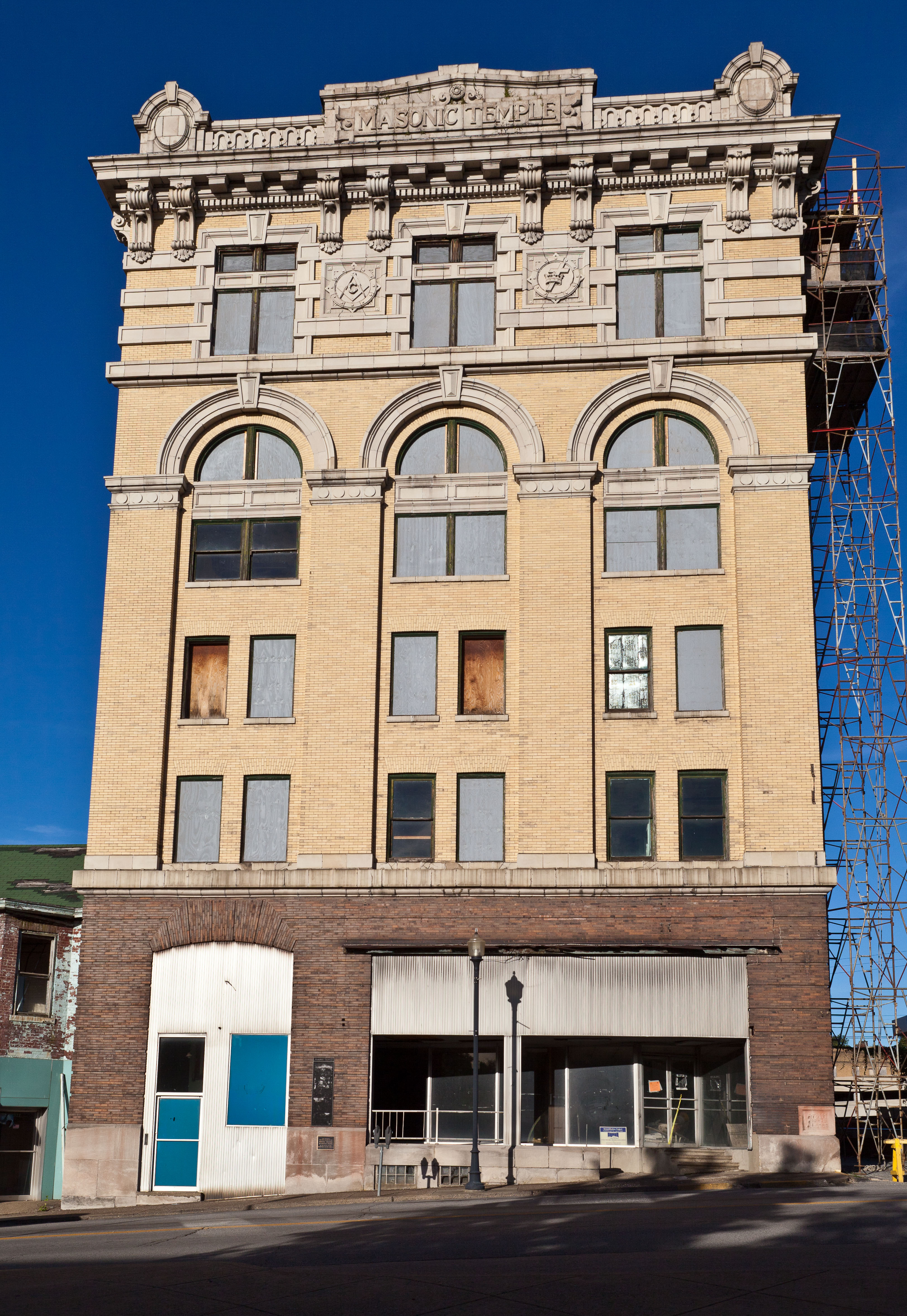
Masonic Temple, Fairmont, West Virginia

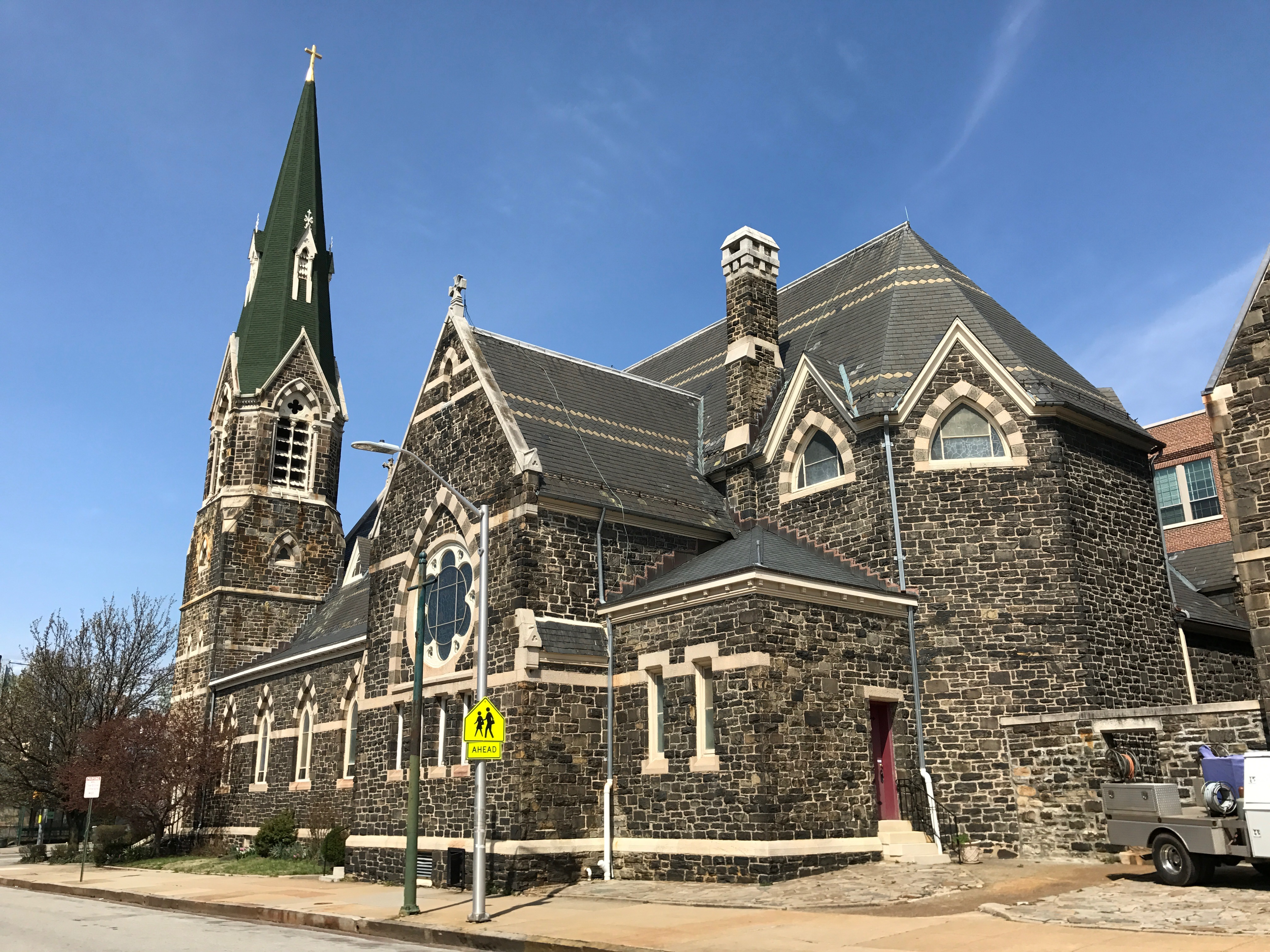
St. Ann Church, Baltimore

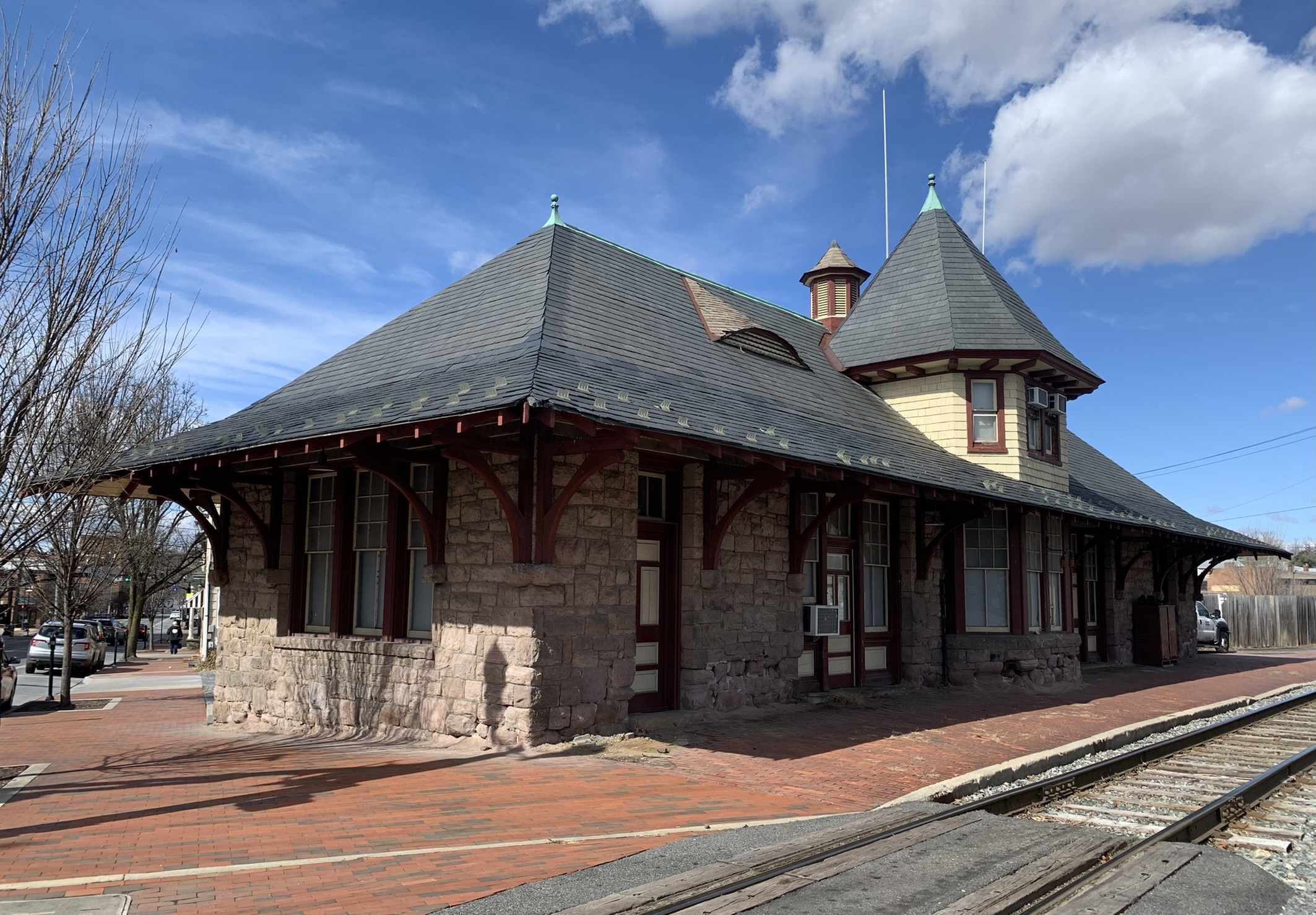
Baltimore & Ohio Railroad station, Winchester, Virginia

== Notes and references ==
- "E. (Ephraim) Francis Baldwin". The Baltimore Architecture Foundation. Archived from the original on January 6, 2009.
- Ephraim Francis Baldwin (1837-1916) at Structurae. Retrieved on May 27, 2006.
- "Ephraim Francis Baldwin". ZhurnalWiki.
- U.S. National Park Service, Historic American Engineering Record, Washington, D.C.(2003). "Baltimore & Ohio Railroad, Harpers Ferry Station, Potomac Street, Harpers Ferry, Jefferson County, WV." Written Historical and Descriptive Data. Survey no. HAER WV-86.
