= Point of Rocks station =

Historic rail station in Maryland, US

Point of Rocks
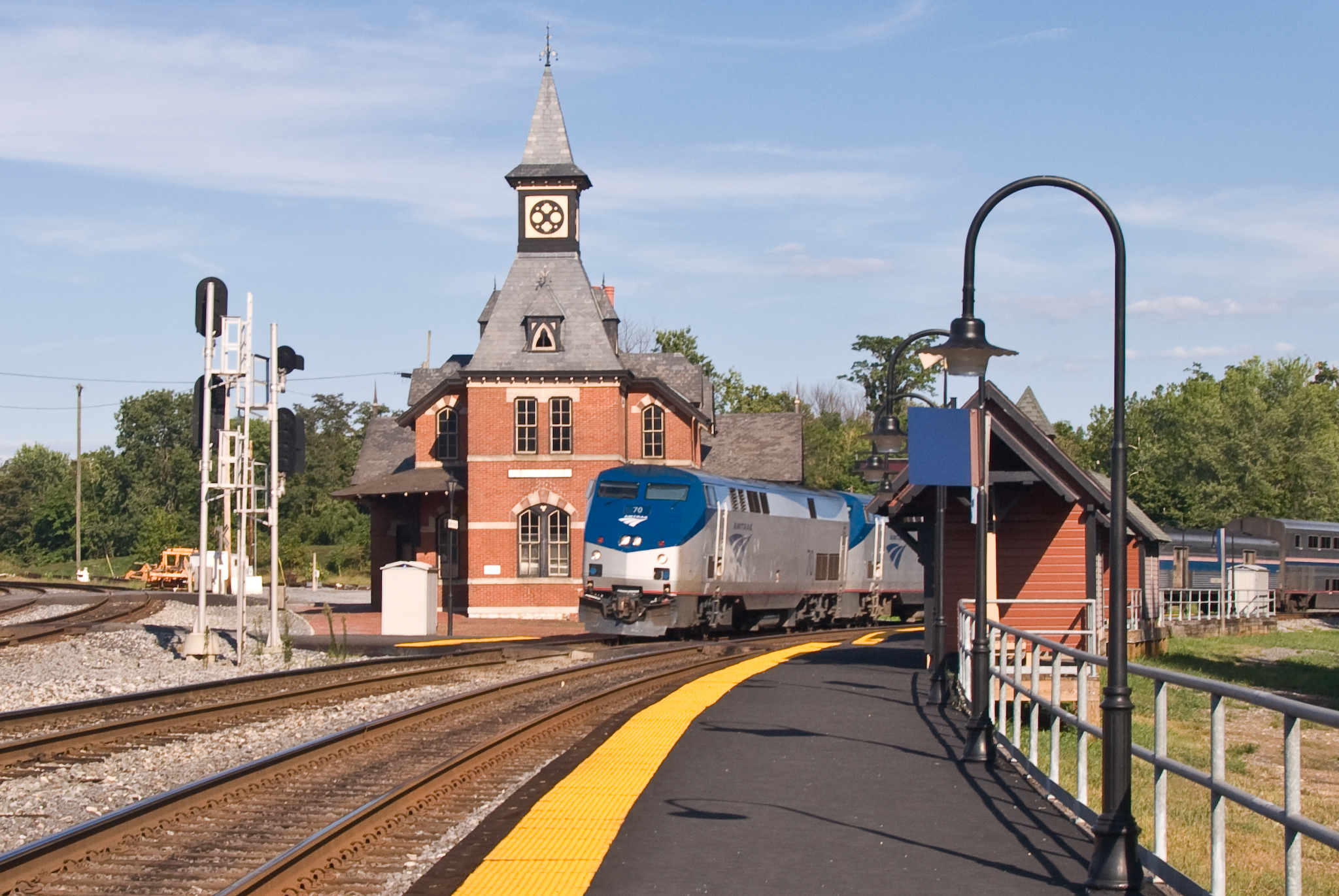
- Amtrak's Capitol Limited passing through the Point of Rocks station.

General information
- Location: 4000 Clay Street; Point of Rocks, Maryland
- Coordinates: 39°16′24.7″N 77°32′00″W
- Line: Metropolitan Subdivision
- Platforms: 2 side platforms
- Tracks: 2
- Connections: TransIT: Point of Rocks Meet-the-MARC shuttle

Construction
- Parking: Yes
- Accessible: No

History
- Opened: May 1, 1873 (ceremonial opening); May 25, 1873 (regular passenger service)

Passengers
- November 2022: 146 (daily) (MARC)

Services
Preceding station	MARC	Following station
Brunswick toward Martinsburg	Brunswick Line	Dickerson toward Union Station
Brunswick Terminus	Brunswick Line limited service	Barnesville toward Camden Station
Former services
Preceding station	Baltimore and Ohio Railroad	Following station
Brunswick toward Chicago	Main Line	Dickerson toward Jersey City
Catoctin toward Chicago	Main Line	Tuscarora toward Jersey City
Terminus	Old Main Line	Adamstown toward Baltimore Camden
- Point of Rocks Railroad Station
- U.S. National Register of Historic Places
- Interactive map of Point of Rocks Railroad Station
- Location: Off of U.S. 15; Point of Rocks, Maryland
- Coordinates: 39°16′24.7″N 77°32′00″W
- Area: 4 acres (1.6 ha)
- Built: 1875
- Architect: E. Francis Baldwin
- Architectural style: Gothic
- NRHP reference No.: 73000918
- Added to NRHP: April 11, 1973
Location

Point of Rocks is a historic passenger rail station on the MARC Brunswick Line between Washington, D.C., and Martinsburg, WV, located at Point of Rocks, Frederick County, Maryland, United States. The station was built by the Baltimore and Ohio Railroad in 1873, and designed by E. Francis Baldwin. It is situated at the junction of the B&O Old Main Line (running to Baltimore) and the Metropolitan Branch (running to Washington, D.C.). The Met Branch also opened in 1873 and became the principal route for passenger trains between Baltimore, Washington and points west.

The main station building is a 2 1/2-story, triangular Gothic Revival with a four-story tower and a 1 1/2-story wing at the base. The tower has a pyramidal roof containing a dormer on each side. On top is a square cupola supporting a pyramidal peaked roof.

The station building itself is not open to the public and is used by CSX as storage and offices for maintenance of way (MOW) crews until 2022 when its windows were boarded and the MOW facilities relocated to Brunswick to the west. In 2008, new platforms and platform shelters were built for MARC commuters traveling east towards Washington DC, replacing older bus shelter–style structures which were erected in the mid-1990s.

During the blizzard of 2010, the south side awning on the main building collapsed under the weight of record snow fall, and was later removed, leaving half the building missing cover. In January 2011, work to rebuild the destroyed part of the structure began.

The Point of Rocks Railroad Station was listed on the National Register of Historic Places in 1973, and reopened for the Maryland Rail Commuter Service, now called MARC, which established the Brunswick Line.

The Duke Energy Holiday Trains display at the Cincinnati Museum Center features a station modeled on Point of Rocks As does the Frederick County Society of Model Railroaders exhibit at the Walkersville Southern Railroad.

In 2023, the station was featured on a USPS Forever stamp in a 5-stamp "Railroad Stations" series. The stamp illustrations were made by Down the Street Designs, and Derry Noyes served as the art director.

Plans are currently underway for the Maryland Department of Transportation to renovate and open the interior of the station for passenger use once negotiations with CSX conclude over site clean up. Future plans include adding a new platform on the wye to serve trains to and from Frederick to increase capacity for the current service as well as additional facilities including an increase in available parking and access for busses serving the station.
