= Buildings at 10, 12, 14, and 16 East Chase Street =

Historic houses in Maryland, United States

- U.S. National Register of Historic Places
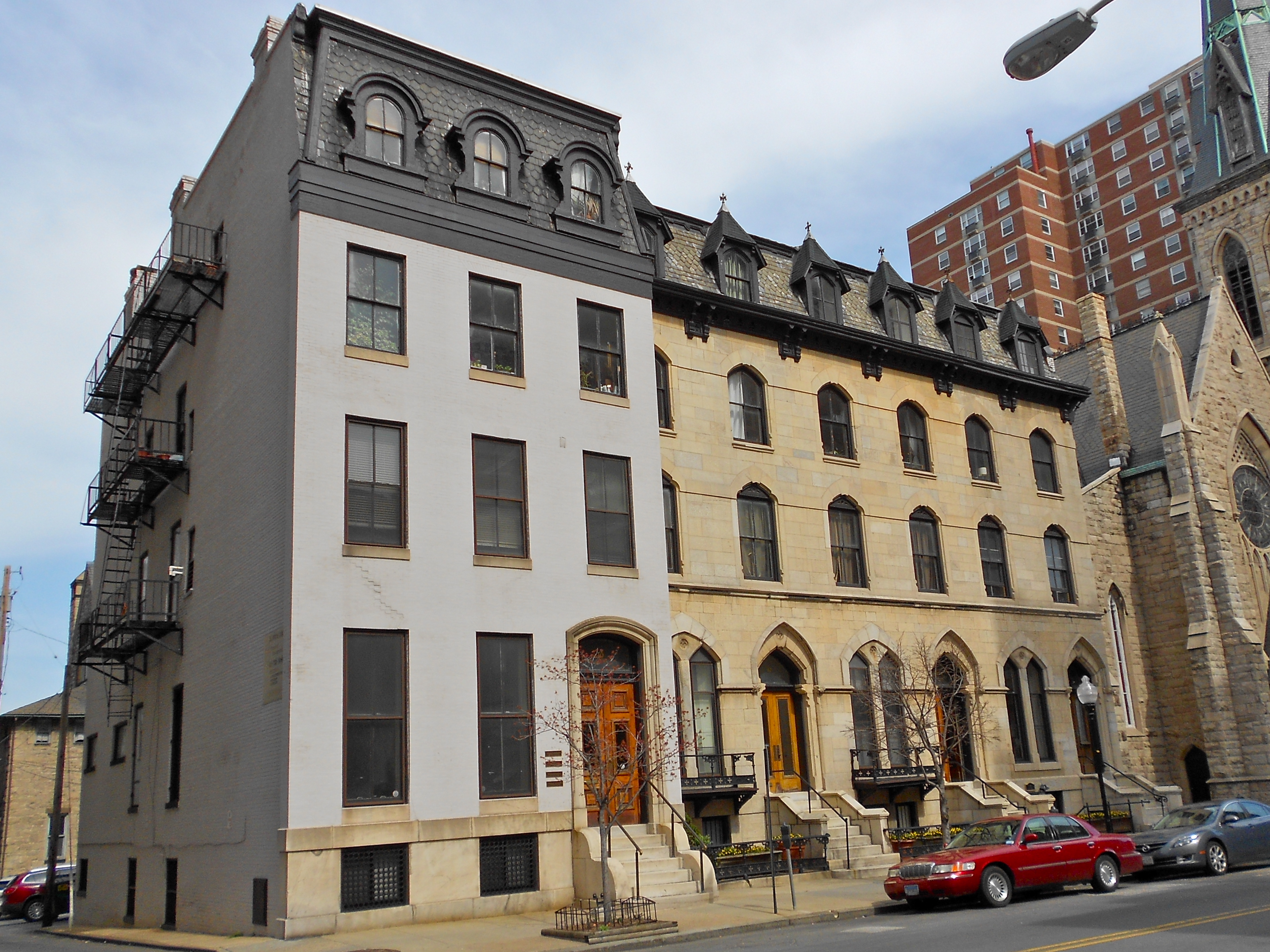
- Buildings at 10, 12, 14, and 16 East Chase Street, March 2012

- Location within Baltimore Location within Maryland Location within the United States
- Location: 10, 12, 14, and 16 E. Chase Street, Baltimore, Maryland
- Coordinates: 39°18′11″N 76°36′56″W
- Area: 0.3 acres (0.12 ha)
- Built: 1872
- Architect: Price, Bruce; Baldwin, E Francis
- Architectural style: Gothic Revival
- NRHP reference No.: 80001783
- Added to NRHP: March 10, 1980

Buildings at 10, 12, 14, and 16 East Chase Street is a historic set of rowhouses located at Baltimore, Maryland, United States. Number 10 is a 3 1/2-story brick townhouse with a 3-bay front façade, fitted with marble facing from ground to first floor level. It is believed to have been designed by Bruce Price and / or E. Francis Baldwin, architects of neighboring Christ Church. Numbers 12, 14, and 16, by contrast, are identical 3 1/2-story, two-bay houses constructed of green serpentine marble with contrasting stone detail. The group dates from between 1870 and 1875. They represent a fine example of the Gothic Revival style as interpreted for domestic architecture.

The Buildings at 10, 12, 14, and 16 East Chase Street were listed on the National Register of Historic Places in 1980.
