= Masonic Temple (Fairmont, West Virginia) =

Historic place in West Virginia, United States

- U.S. National Register of Historic Places
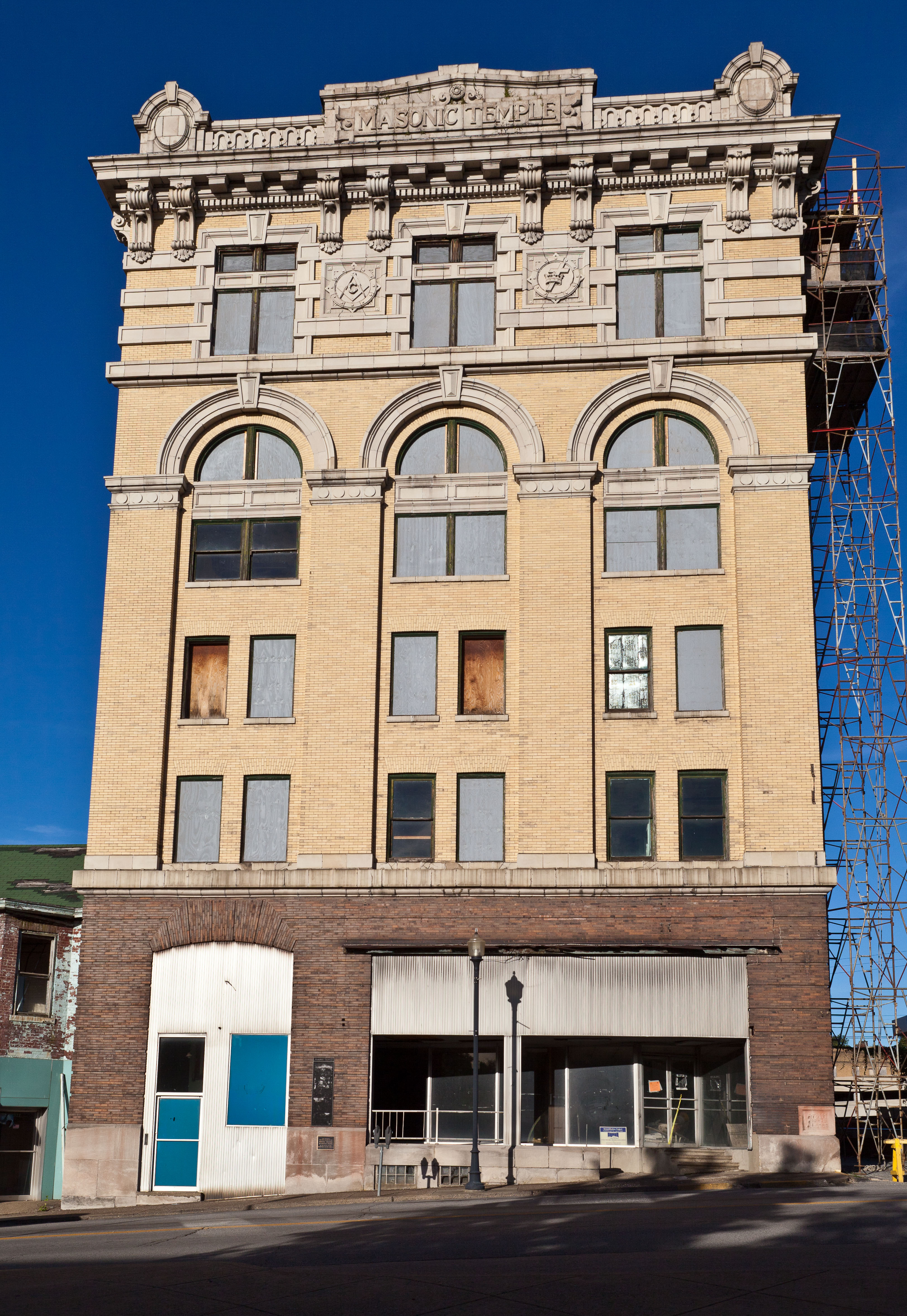

- Location within West Virginia Location within the United States
- Location: 320 Jefferson St., Fairmont, West Virginia
- Coordinates: 39°29′8″N 80°8′34″W
- Area: less than one acre
- Built: 1906
- Architect: Giffin, H.F.; Brady Construction Co.
- Architectural style: Beaux Arts
- NRHP reference No.: 93000218
- Added to NRHP: April 9, 1993

The Masonic Temple is a historic building located at Fairmont, Marion County, West Virginia. It was designed by the Baltimore architectural firm Baldwin & Pennington, built in 1906–1907, and is a large, five-story, three bay mixed use commercial building with a mezzanine, a balcony, a partial sixth floor and a full basement. It measures 55 feet wide, 109 feet deep, and 90 feet high. The buildings has a steel and reinforced concrete structure and is faced in beige brick with extensive terra cotta detailing. The building was commissioned by Fairmont Lodge No. 9 (which no longer meets in the building), and is in the Beaux-Arts style.

It was listed on the National Register of Historic Places in 1993.
