= Brunswick station (Maryland) =

MARC rail station in Brunswick, Maryland, United States

Brunswick
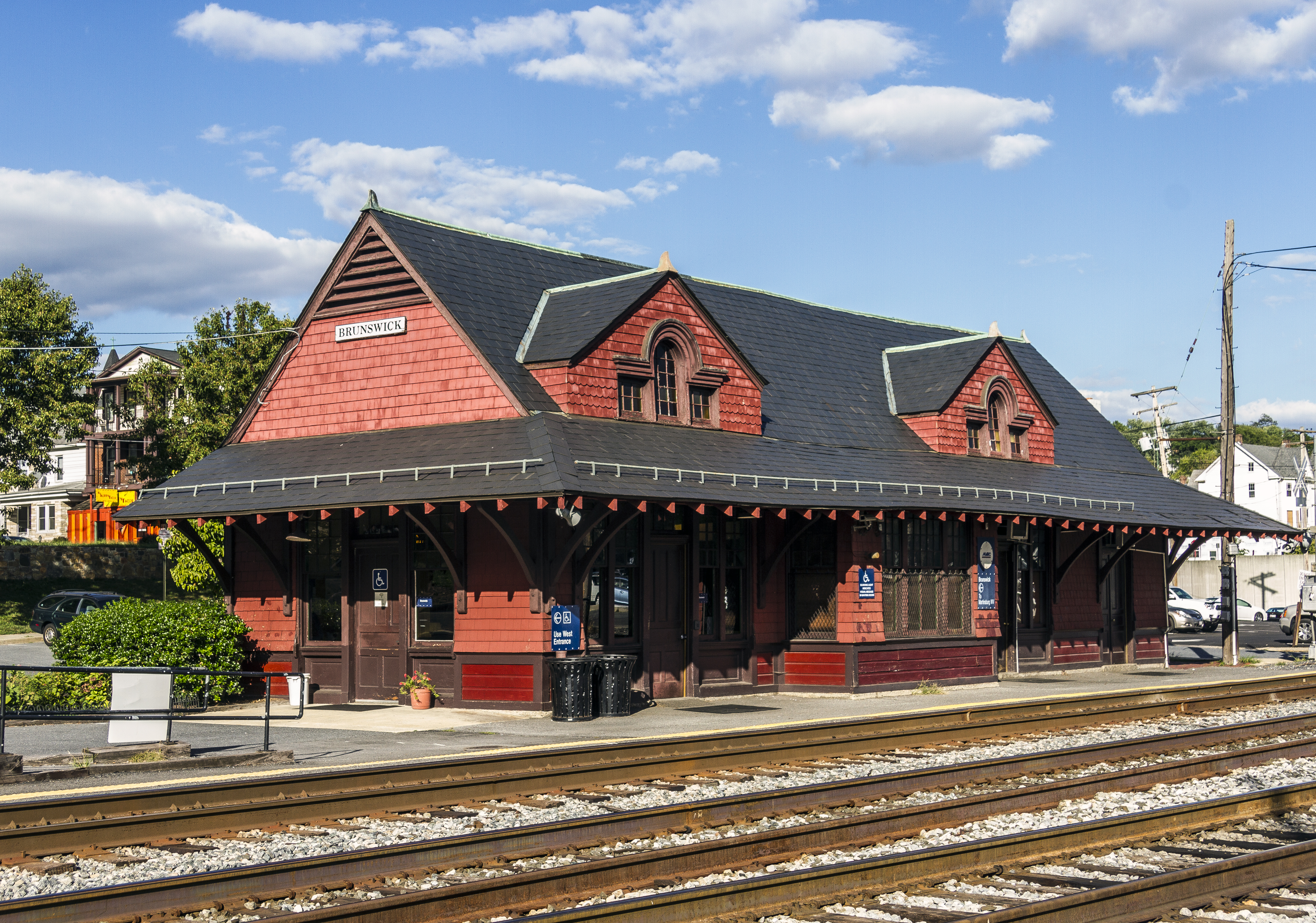
- Brunswick station house, September 2012

General information
- Location: 100 South Maple Avenue, Brunswick, Maryland
- Coordinates: 39°18′43″N 77°37′38″W
- Owner: City of Brunswick
- Lines: Cumberland Subdivision; Metropolitan Subdivision
- Platforms: 3 side platforms
- Tracks: 4
- Connections: EPTA bus: MARC-H, MARC-M

Construction
- Parking: Yes
- Accessible: Yes

History
- Rebuilt: 1891

Passengers
- November 2022: 174 (daily) (MARC)

Services
Preceding station	MARC	Following station
Harpers Ferry toward Martinsburg	Brunswick Line	Point of Rocks toward Union Station
Terminus	Brunswick Line limited service	Point of Rocks toward Camden Station
Former services
Preceding station	Amtrak	Following station
Harpers Ferry toward Martinsburg	Blue Ridge ended 1986	Gaithersburg toward Washington, D.C.
Harpers Ferry toward Cincinnati (River Road)	Shenandoah ended 1981	Gaithersburg toward Washington, D.C.
Preceding station	Baltimore and Ohio Railroad	Following station
Harpers Ferry toward Chicago	Main Line	Point of Rocks toward Jersey City
Knoxville toward Chicago	Main Line	Tuscarora toward Jersey City
- Baltimore and Ohio Station
- U.S. Historic district – Contributing property
- Architect: Ephraim Francis Baldwin
- Architectural style: Queen Anne
- Part of: Brunswick Historic District (ID79001128)
- Added to NRHP: August 29, 1979
Location

Brunswick is a passenger rail station on the MARC Brunswick Line between Washington, D.C., and Martinsburg, West Virginia. The station house, located at 100 South Maple Street in Brunswick, Maryland, is a former Baltimore and Ohio Railroad depot that is a contributing property to the Brunswick Historic District, which has been listed on the National Register of Historic Places since August 29, 1979. The station was designed by Ephraim Francis Baldwin and opened in 1891 on Seventh Avenue. Several years later the building was moved to its current location. It is a wooden frame building with stone walls up to the window sills, and features Palladian windows in the roof dormers.

Amtrak's former Blue Ridge previously served the station and eventually dropped the stop from its timetables. The Brunswick station was the final station in the CSX System to eliminate human ticket agents. Barb Eichelberger, the last employee of her kind in the entire system, retired in June 2010.

Brunswick features a unique station layout in which the westbound and eastbound tracks are separated by the station's parking lot. The station house is located just north of a platform serving the Martinsburg-bound trains, while two side platforms south of the parking lot serve Washington-bound trains.
