= Frederick station =

MARC rail station in Frederick, Maryland, United States

Frederick
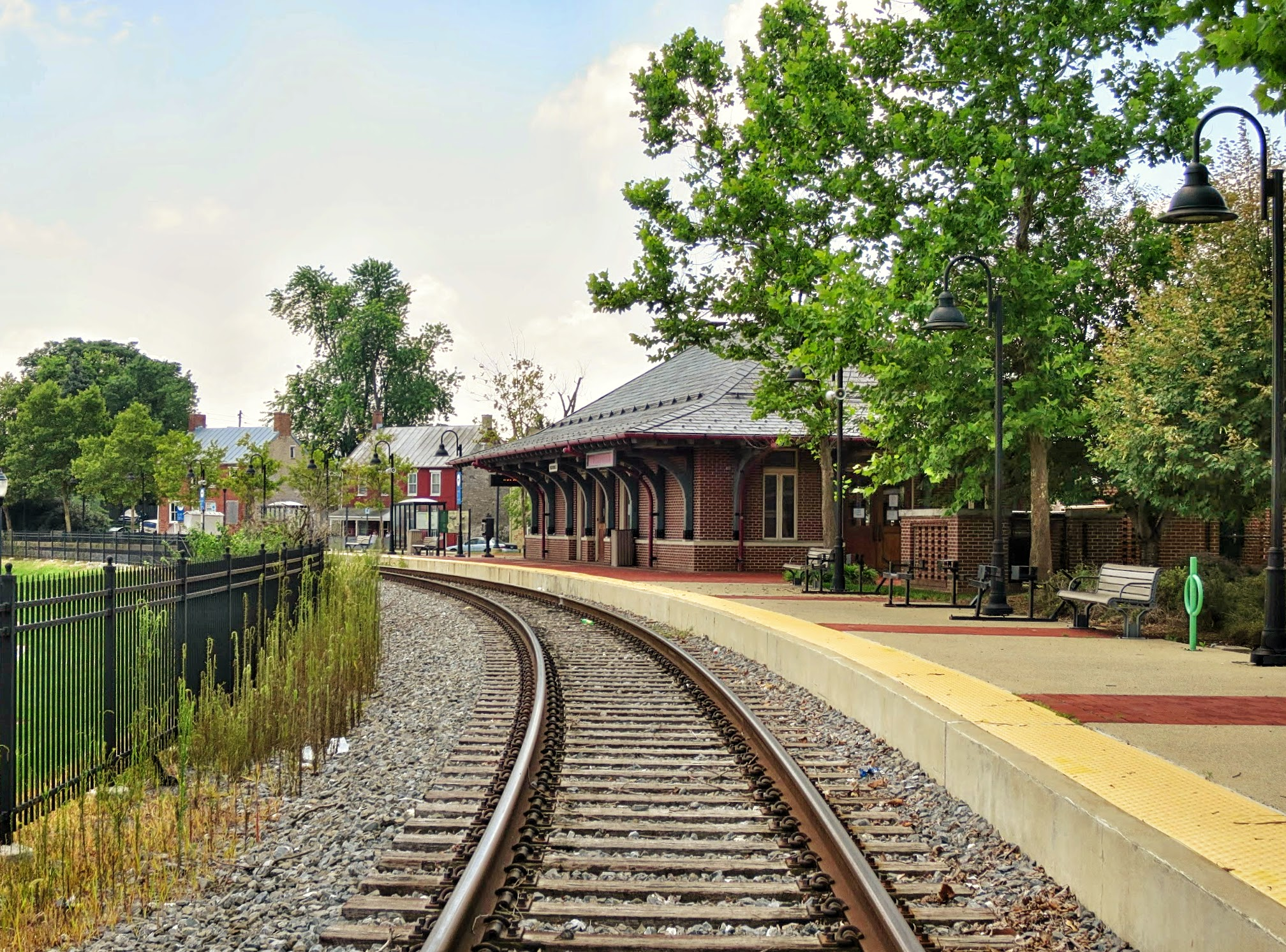
- Frederick station in July 2015

General information
- Location: 100 South East Street, Frederick, Maryland
- Coordinates: 39.4119°N 77.4055°W
- Line: Frederick Branch
- Platforms: 1 side platform
- Tracks: 1
- Connections: TransIT Services of Frederick; Greyhound Lines; Amtrak Thruway

Construction
- Parking: Yes
- Accessible: Yes

History
- Opened: December 17, 2001

Passengers
- November 2022: 48 (daily) (MARC)

Services
Preceding station	MARC	Following station
Terminus	Brunswick Line	Monocacy toward Union Station
Location

Frederick is a passenger rail station and the northern terminus of the MARC Brunswick Line's Frederick branch, which heads south toward Washington, D.C. This is one of two stations on the Frederick branch. The station is also a major hub for buses of the TransIT Services of Frederick, Maryland.

Frederick Station is located at 100 South East Street, at the south end of the bridge over Carroll Creek in Frederick, Maryland. It was built on December 17, 2001, on the old Frederick Branch of the Baltimore and Ohio Railroad, and was designed to represent some of the original B&O depots of the 19th century. The station is ADA accessible due to a mini-high platform.

Loudoun County Transit served Frederick station during its pilot project from October 20, 2025 to September 30, 2026.
