= National Capital Park and Planning Commission =

National Capital Park and Planning Commission may refer to

- Maryland-National Capital Park and Planning Commission
- National Capital Planning Commission, formerly known by this name from 1926 to 1952 and previously as the National Capital Park Commission
