= Falls Road Park =

Park in Potomac, Maryland, United States

Coordinates: 39°03′50″N 77°10′41″W

Hadley's Park
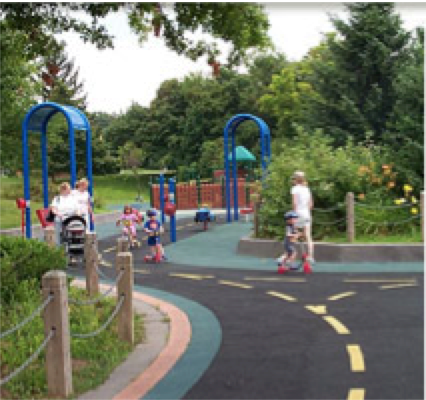

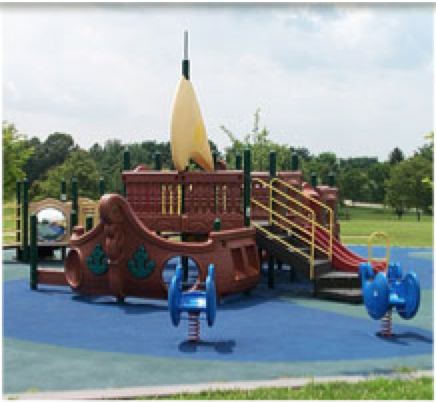
- Type: Urban park
- Location: Potomac, Maryland, United States
- Area: 20 acres (0.081 km^{2})
- Created: 1999
- Operator: Maryland-National Capital Park and Planning Commission
- Status: Open all year

Falls Road Local Park (also locally referred to as Hadley's Park) is an urban park located in Potomac, Maryland. The park covers twenty acres acquired by Maryland-National Capital Park and Planning Commission (M-NCPPC) in 1986. The park contains multi-purpose playing fields used for recreational and sporting events such as soccer, baseball/softball, football, picnics and small fairs.

A playground named Hadley's Park was created in 1999, designed to be used by both able-bodied and disabled children.

== Description ==
The park has three different play sets (a pirate ship, frontier village, and a castle), handicap accessible swing sets, a large picnic area, and a hard yet yielding surface supporting the use of wheelchairs, walkers, bikes, scooters, roller blades, etc. Within the park are different games and challenges written on bright colorful signs in braille for visually impaired children.

== Creation ==
Shelley Kramm, a resident of Potomac, Maryland, came up with the idea for a playground specifically designed for children with disabilities after having difficulties with other playgrounds unsuited for the use of her disabled daughter Hadley. As Kramm's daughter needed a wheelchair, other playgrounds were inaccessible due to surfaces, such as gravel and woodchip, that made the use of a wheelchair difficult. In October 1996, Kramm formed Hadley's Park Incorporation, a non-profit organization to plan for the creation of a new playground more accessible to children with disabilities.

The organization also proposed other parks around the Washington Metropolitan area. Hadley's Park was the first disabled-accessible playground in Maryland and one of the first of its kind in the United States.

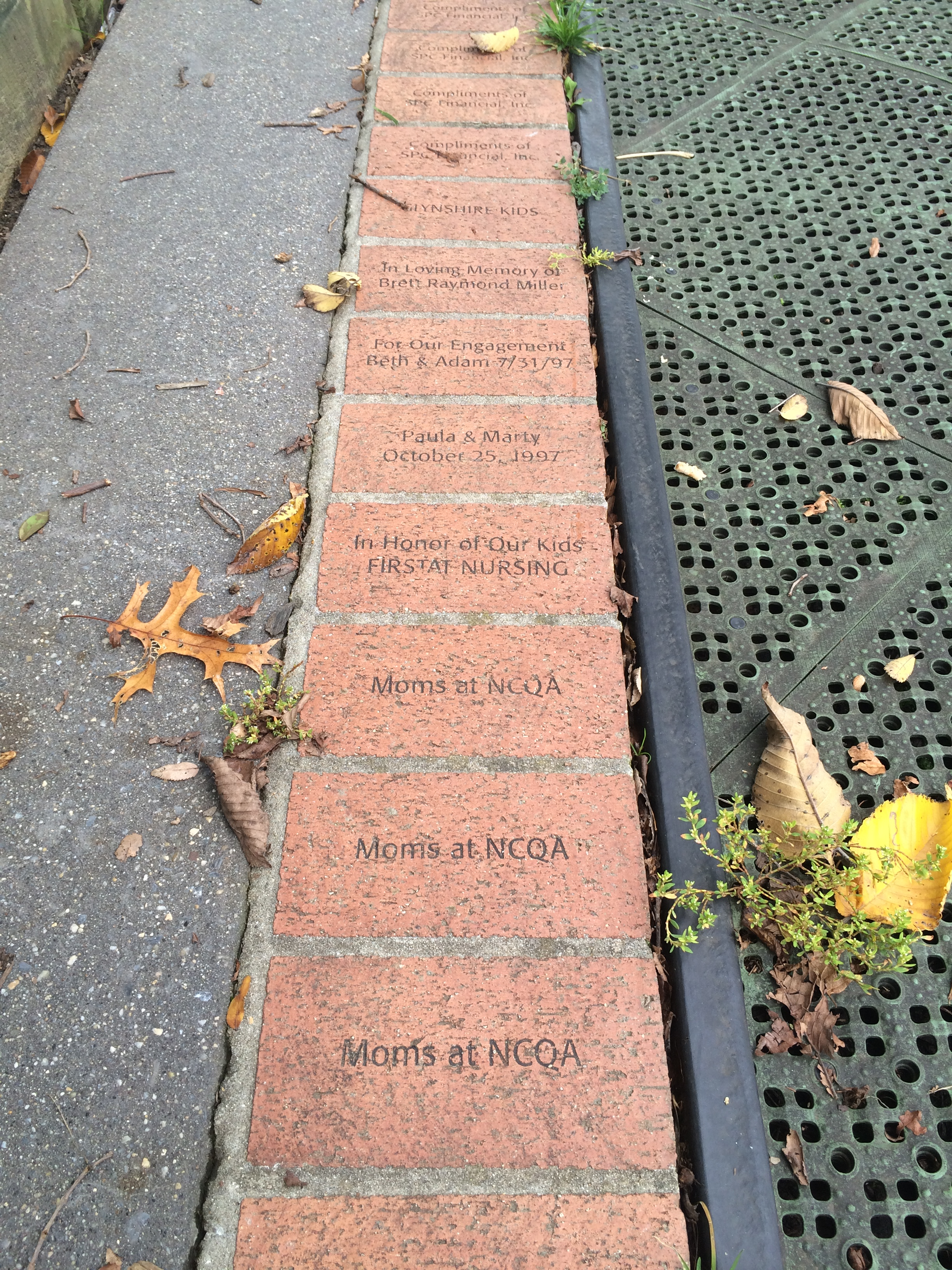
The personalized bricks which line the sidewalk at Hadley's Park (Potomac, Maryland)

The organization required a million dollars to be able to fund the playground. Kramm spent five years lobbying Maryland General Assembly and Montgomery County, and raising funds from fast-food chains. Hadley's Park raised over $1,000,000; among other tactics, the organization sold personalized bricks, which line the park walkways, held a 5k race with many participants, which involved special need competitors and finally held a silent auction. Park construction began in September 1998.

== Landscaping ==
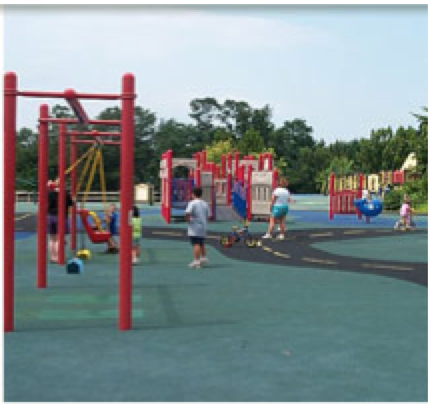
The frontier village at Hadley's Park (Potomac, Maryland)

In 1999, Hadley's Park opened with a castle, a frontier village and a pirate ship. Rather than using gravel or woodchips, Hadley's Park had a rubber-based surface covering 34,000 square feet (3,200 m^{2}) of playing surface. This is one of the largest pour-in-place playing surfaces in the world. The surface is durable enough for wheelchairs and walkers, yet soft enough not to hurt a child if they fall. The incorporation of high edge curbs, bright colors and braille signage supports visually-impaired children.

Two layers of the porous compound were installed over an underlying drainage system, allowing water to flow at a constant rate throughout the park and underneath the play surface. While the rubber surface seems positive, unfortunately the surface holds surface temperature of a high heat, making it uncomfortably hot in the summer.

== Maintenance ==
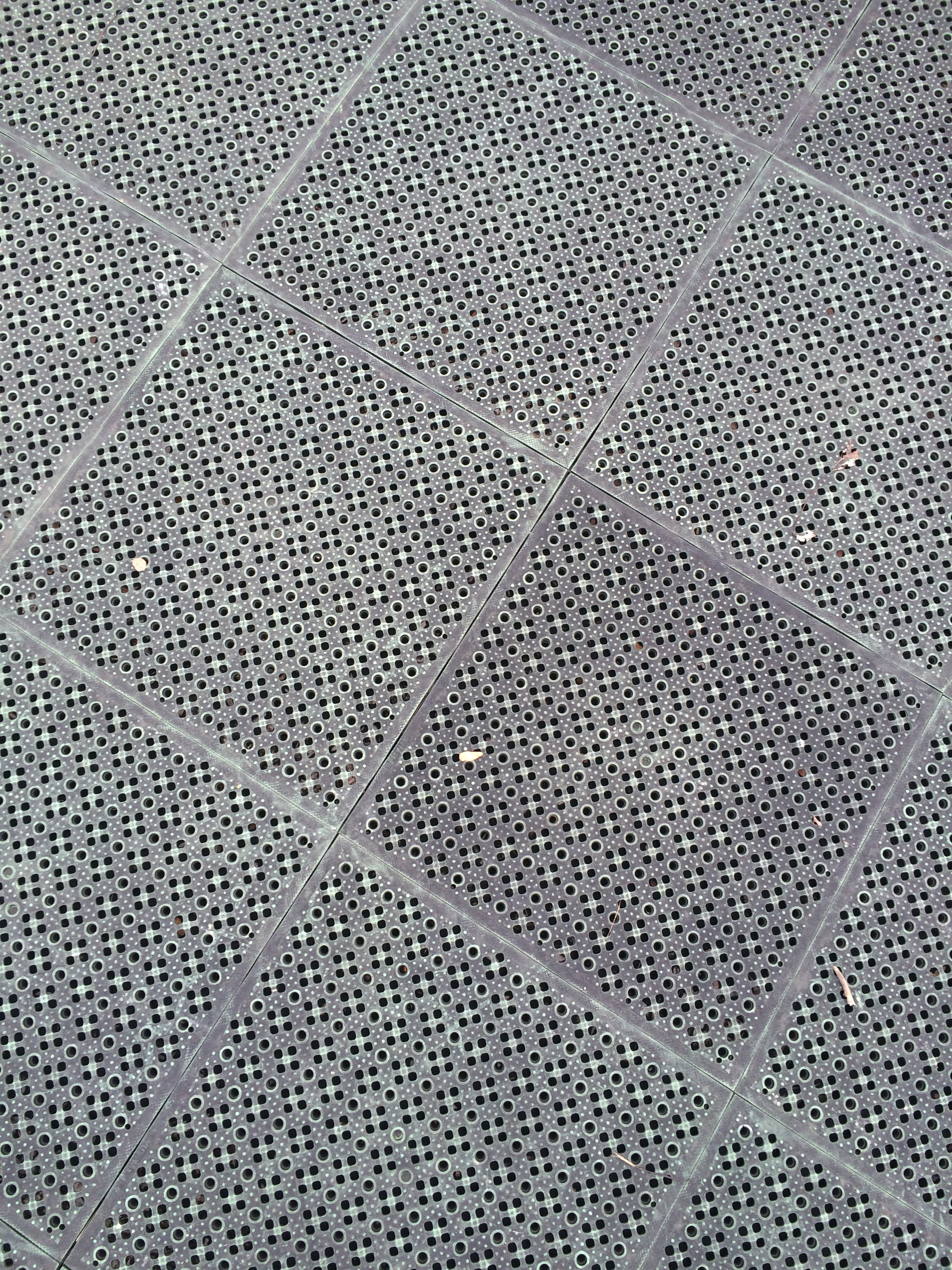
The new interlocking playing surface at Hadley's Park (Potomac, Maryland)

Over the years, the soft rubber safety surface began to deteriorate due to frequent and constant use. The most damaged areas were under the playground equipment (particularly the swings). Therefore, equipment was removed in to keep up with safety regulations and guidelines.

Due to a lack of funds, renovations for the park were put on hold. The delay caused local frustration due to its overwhelming popularity. Funds were eventually raised for a new surface to be installed in 2009. The new surface consists of using interlocking squares allowing quick and easy installation.

During this renovation, a large part of the castle playground was removed to be replaced with a larger and more accompanying picnic area for families.

== Other parks ==
After Hadley's Park was created, Shelley Kramm was invited to help create new, similar parks. In particular, she worked with Dulles Town Center to create a 4,000 square feet (370 m^{2}) park similar to Hadley's Park. Three more playgrounds were created at schools in Maryland, including Talbot County, Maryland.

Her work has inspired the creation of 250 similar playgrounds nationwide.

== Winding-up of Hadley's Park Inc. ==
In 2003, Shelley Kramm began to close down her non-profit organization, Hadley's Park.

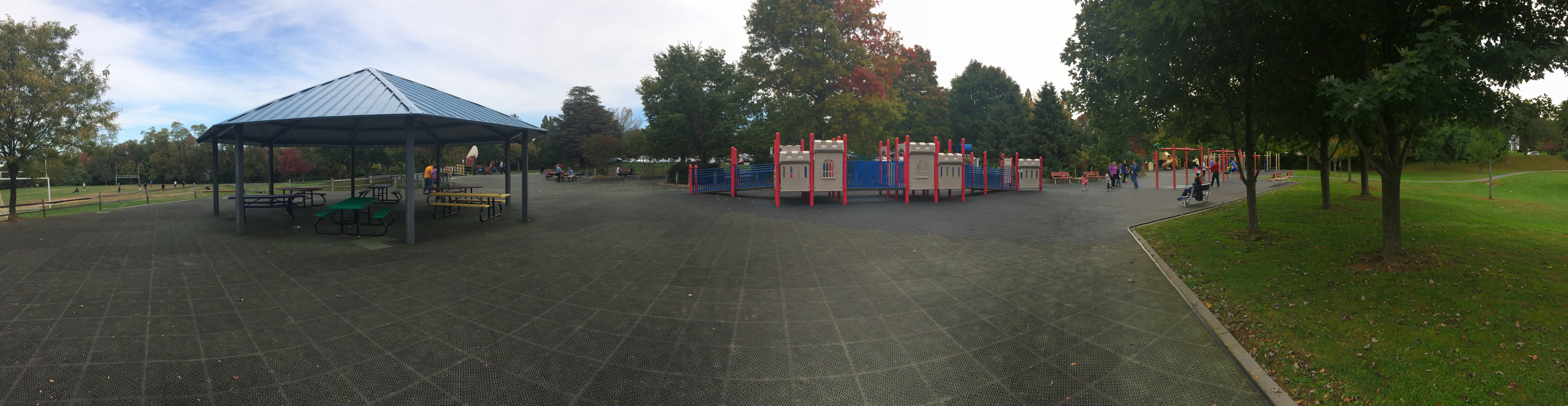
A panorama of the original park

== Project credits ==
Landscape Architect: Grace E. Fielder and Associates, Laurel, Maryland.

Consultant: Bosco Associates, Inc., Alexandria, Virginia.

Surfacing: Vitriturf, Vitricon, Hauppauge, New York.

Equipment: Little Tikes Commercial Playground Systems, Farmington, Missouri.

Client: Hadley's Park, Inc., Potomac, Maryland.

== Awards ==
1. October 1998 Potomac Chamber of Commerce, Citizen of the Year
2. April 1999 J Hadassah, Myrtle Wreath Award
3. January 2000 Montgomery County Foundation, Appreciation Honors Award
4. June 2000 The ARC, Meritorious Service Award
5. November 2000 Daughters of the American Revolution, Excellence in Community Service
6. June 2001 WETA Hometown Heroes Recipient
7. November 2001 Jewish Social Services, Jack L Lehrman-George M Pikser Award
8. October 2003 Jewish Foundation of Group Homes, S. Robert Cohen Award
9. 2005 Washingtonian Magazine, Washingtonian of the Year
10. 2005 Exceptional Parent Magazine, Maxwell J Schliffer Award
