= Corridor Cities Transitway =

Proposal for transit improvement in Maryland

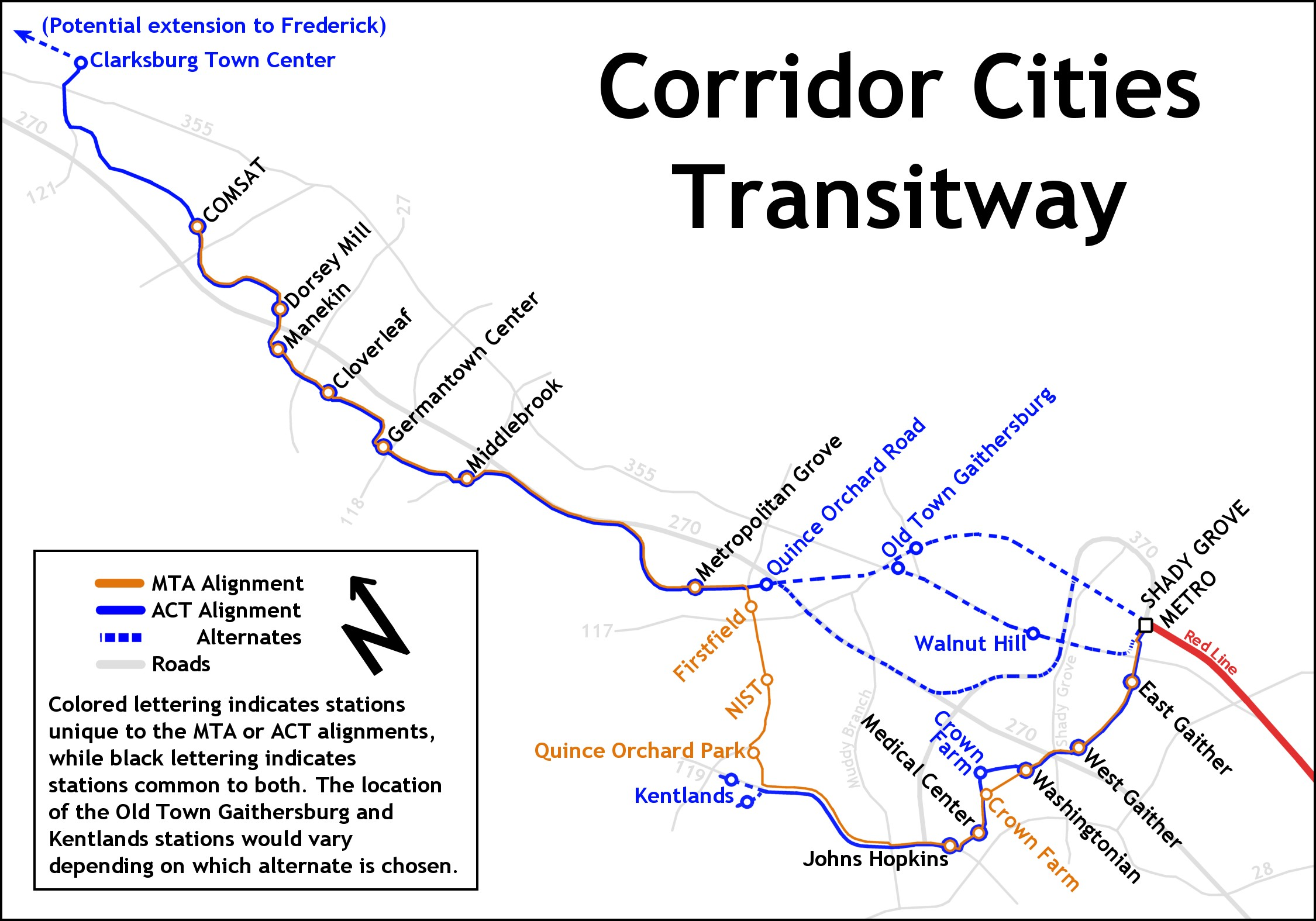
- A map of the officially proposed transitway route (orange), with an alternate alignment proposed by the Action Committee for Transit (blue).

Overview
- System: Maryland Transit Administration
- Garage: Metropolitan Grove station
- Status: Cancelled

Route
- Route type: Bus rapid transit
- Locale: Montgomery County, Maryland
- Start: Clarksburg Town Center
- End: Shady Grove station
- Length: 15 mi (24 km)
- Stops: 13
- Other routes: CCT Service via Universities at Shady Grove

Service
- Level: Daily
- Frequency: 3.5 minutes peak, 6 minutes mid-day, 10 minutes off-peak
- Weekend frequency: 10 minutes
- Journey time: 38 minutes
- Operates: 4:30 AM - 1:00 AM
- Ridership: 35,900 (2035)

The Corridor Cities Transitway (CCT) was a proposed 15-mile (24 km) bus rapid transit line in Maryland that would have run from the Shady Grove Metro station in Gaithersburg northwest to Clarksburg. The proposed master plans for Montgomery County and Frederick County had provided for the eventual extension of the CCT northward along I-270 into Frederick City. The Maryland Department of Transportation (MDOT) removed the project from its priority list in 2016 and from the Consolidated Transportation Plan in 2019. “'From all indications, the project is dead,' said state Del. Kirill Reznik (D-Montgomery)."

In 2022 the Montgomery County Government approved an alternative transit plan.

== History ==
On August 5, 2013, the State of Maryland announced that $100 million was budgeted for planning, final design, and right-of-way acquisition for the first phase of the project, which comprises 9 miles (14 km) of the route, from Shady Grove to Metropolitan Grove station. As of 2012, the Phase I cost was estimated at $545 million, and the total project cost was estimated to be $828 million. No funding was allocated for the second phase, which would have covered an additional 6 miles (9.7 km), from Metropolitan Grove to the former COMSAT Laboratories building, south of Clarksburg. The state had applied for federal grants for the project in 2013.

A study was performed by the Maryland Transit Administration (MTA) in coordination with the larger I-270/US 15 Multi-Modal Corridor Study conducted by the Maryland Department of Transportation, examining multiple options for the region including possible express toll lanes along I-270.

Funding for the project was not included in Maryland's proposed transportation budget for 2017. Subsequently, the state removed the project from the development and evaluation phase of the Consolidated Transportation Plan. "The state’s change is a death knell for the long-anticipated project ... said state Del. Kirill Reznik."

In 2019 MDOT spokeswoman Erin Henson said the state would only be involved if the project connected "multiple jurisdictions in more than one county." The CCT project “is solely located in one county, making Montgomery County the lead for future work on this local project."

In 2025 the Montgomery County Planning Board noted that while the CCT "had once been a fixture in a variety of master plans," the design became outdated. Changes in "projected land uses" and "fluctuating demands for the transit service" made the CCT impractical, although needs for additional transit resources in the I-270 corridor still existed.

== Alternative plan ==
In 2022 the Montgomery County Council approved a new transit plan, "Corridor Forward" as an alternative to the CCT. The alternative plan calls for a network of dedicated bus lanes connected to existing transit lines that would be less expensive to build and operate. Subsequently the county government, as it develops and updates master plans for various areas, has been incorporating "Corridor Forward" concepts into those plans. One such example is the 2025 Gateway Sector Plan for Clarksburg.
