= Rockville station =

Train station in Rockville, Maryland, US

Rockville
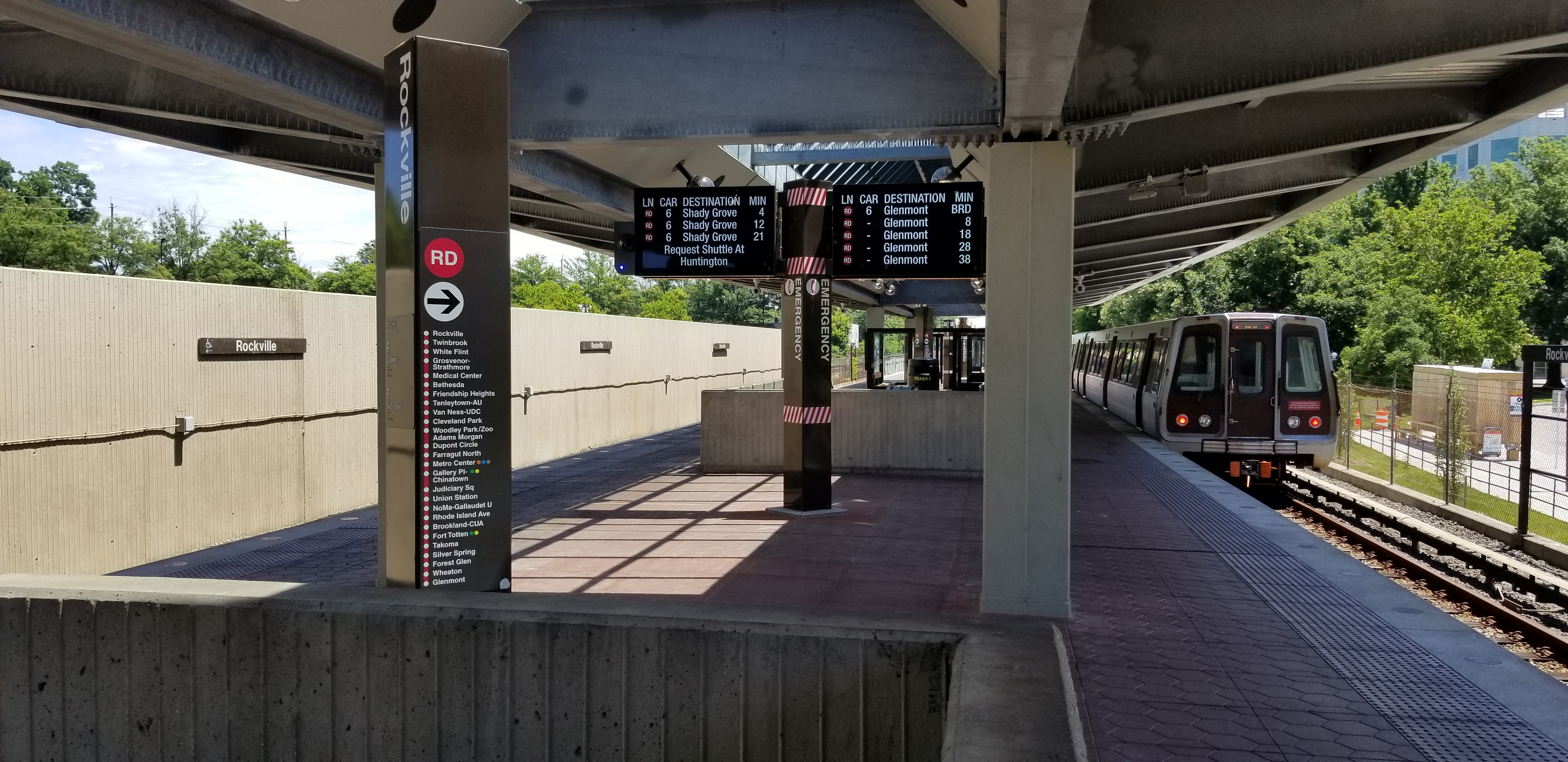
- The station in July 2022

General information
- Location: 251 Hungerford Drive and 307 South Stonestreet Avenue; Rockville, Maryland; United States
- Coordinates: 39.084238°N 77.146125°W
- Owner: WMATA (station); CSX (tracks)
- Lines: CSX Metropolitan Subdivision; WMATA A Route
- Platforms: 1 island platform (Red Line); 2 side platforms (Metropolitan Subdivision)
- Tracks: 4 (2 for each service)
- Connections: Ride On: 40, 44, 45, 46, 47, 48, 49, 52, 54, 55, 56, 59, 63, 81, 101, 301; Metrobus: M82

Construction
- Parking: 524 spaces
- Cycle facilities: Capital Bikeshare, 69 racks and 40 lockers
- Accessible: Yes

Other information
- Station code: Amtrak: RKV; Metro: A15

History
- Opened: December 15, 1984

Passengers
- FY 2025: 5,616 annually (Amtrak)
- November 2022: 165 daily (MARC)
- 2025: 2,798 (average weekday) (Metro)
- Rank: 64 of 98 (Metro)

Services
Preceding station	Amtrak	Following station
Harpers Ferry toward Chicago	Floridian	Washington, D.C. toward Miami
Preceding station	MARC	Following station
Washington Grove toward Martinsburg or Frederick	Brunswick Line	Garrett Park toward Union Station
Gaithersburg toward Brunswick	Brunswick Line limited service	Kensington toward Camden Station
Preceding station	Washington Metro	Following station
Shady Grove Terminus	Red Line	Twinbrook toward Glenmont
Former services
Preceding station	Amtrak	Following station
Gaithersburg toward Martinsburg	Blue Ridge 1973–1986	Silver Spring toward Washington, D.C.
Gaithersburg toward Cincinnati (River Road)	Shenandoah 1976–1981	Silver Spring toward Washington, D.C.
Harpers Ferry toward Chicago	Capitol Limited 1981-2024	Washington, D.C. Terminus
Preceding station	Baltimore and Ohio Railroad	Following station
Washington Grove toward Chicago	Main Line	Garrett Park toward Jersey City
Westmore toward Chicago	Main Line	Autrey Park toward Jersey City
- Rockville Railroad Station
- U.S. National Register of Historic Places
- Location: 98 Church Street, Rockville, Maryland
- Coordinates: 39°4′58″N 77°8′42″W
- Built: 1873
- Architect: Ephraim Francis Baldwin
- Architectural style: Queen Anne
- NRHP reference No.: 74000961
- Added to NRHP: July 18, 1974
Route map
Location

Rockville station is an intermodal train station located in downtown Rockville, Maryland, United States. It is served by the Washington Metro Red Line, MARC Brunswick Line commuter trains, and Amtrak Floridian intercity trains.

The first Rockville station opened in 1873 as part of the Baltimore and Ohio Railroad (B&O)'s Metropolitan Branch (now the CSX Metropolitan Subdivision). B&O intercity service served the station until 1971; the station continued to be served by commuter trains (which became the Brunswick Line in the 1980s). Amtrak service began in 1973 with the Blue Ridge, followed by the Shenandoah in 1976, the Capitol Limited in 1981, and the Floridian in 2024.

The original station building, designed by Ephraim Francis Baldwin, was added to the National Register of Historic Places in 1974 as Rockville Railroad Station. It was moved slightly to the south in 1981 to make room for Metro construction and is among the few original Metropolitan Branch stations to survive.

The modern Metro station opened on December 15, 1984.

== History ==
=== Original station ===
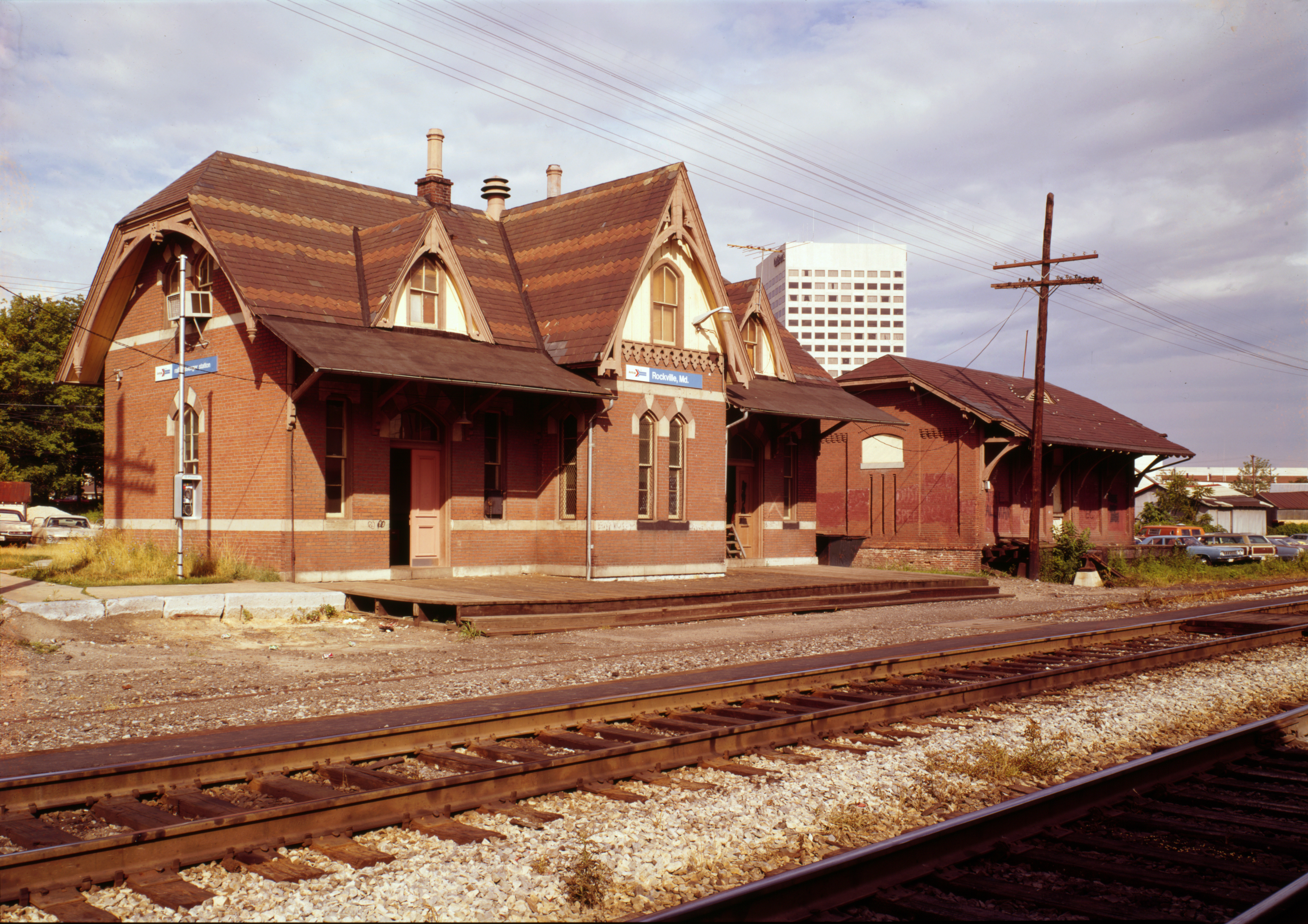
Rockville station and freight house in 1978, before its move

The original Rockville station was built in 1873 by the Baltimore and Ohio Railroad (B&O) to serve its new Metropolitan Branch, which provided direct service from Washington, D.C., to points west. Designed by Ephraim Francis Baldwin, the railroad's head architect, it is a brick Victorian structure with some Eastlake detailing, particularly in the roofline and gable decoration.

The station opened on May 19, 1873, just weeks after the Met Branch began operation. It would be served by commuter and intercity trains exclusively throughout the B&O era. (The first stop for long-distance trains out of Washington was Silver Spring station.)

A freight house, also designed by Baldwin, was added in 1887. By 1890, the convenient access to the nation's capital had led Rockville's population to more than double.

When Amtrak took over intercity passenger service on May 1, 1971, it did not include any service on the B&O; Rockville was served only by three daily commuter round trips to Brunswick and Martinsburg. Amtrak introduced the West Virginian (later renamed the Potomac Turbo and Potomac Special) in September 1971; it did not stop at Rockville. The Blue Ridge replaced the Potomac Special on May 5, 1973. The Blue Ridge was timed to serve as a commuter train; eastbound-only stops at Rockville and Gaithersburg were added on July 1, 1973. The Shenandoah, which stopped at Rockville in both directions, was added on October 31, 1976. The Blue Ridge began stopping at Rockville and Gaithersburg in both directions on weekends in 1977. The Shenandoah was replaced by the Capitol Limited on October 1, 1981, at which time weekend service ended on the Blue Ridge.

The station building was added to the National Register of Historic Places in 1974 as the Rockville Railroad Station.

Construction of a modern station for Amtrak, state-subsidized B&O commuter trains, and the new Washington Metro system began in 1981.

The original station and freight house, initially slated for demolition, were saved by local preservationists. On March 2, 1981, the buildings were moved about 50 metres (160 ft) to the south.

=== Current station ===
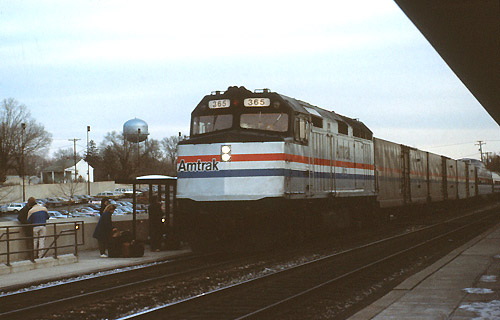
The Capitol Limited at Rockville in 1987

The new station opened on December 15, 1984, as part of a 7-mile (11 km), four-station extension of the Red Line from Grosvenor–Strathmore station to Shady Grove station.

In 1986, the Blue Ridge was taken over by MARC as part of the Brunswick Line—the state-subsidized ex-B&O commuter service—leaving the Capitol Limited as the only Amtrak service to Rockville.

On January 26, 2010, two Metro employees were killed when they were hit by a piece of track equipment at the station. They were installing new train control equipment in the track bed on the outbound track of the Red Line. From September 11, 2021, to January 16, 2022, the Metro station was closed for canopy replacement. On November 10, 2024, the Capitol Limited was merged with the Silver Star to become the Floridian.

== Station layout ==
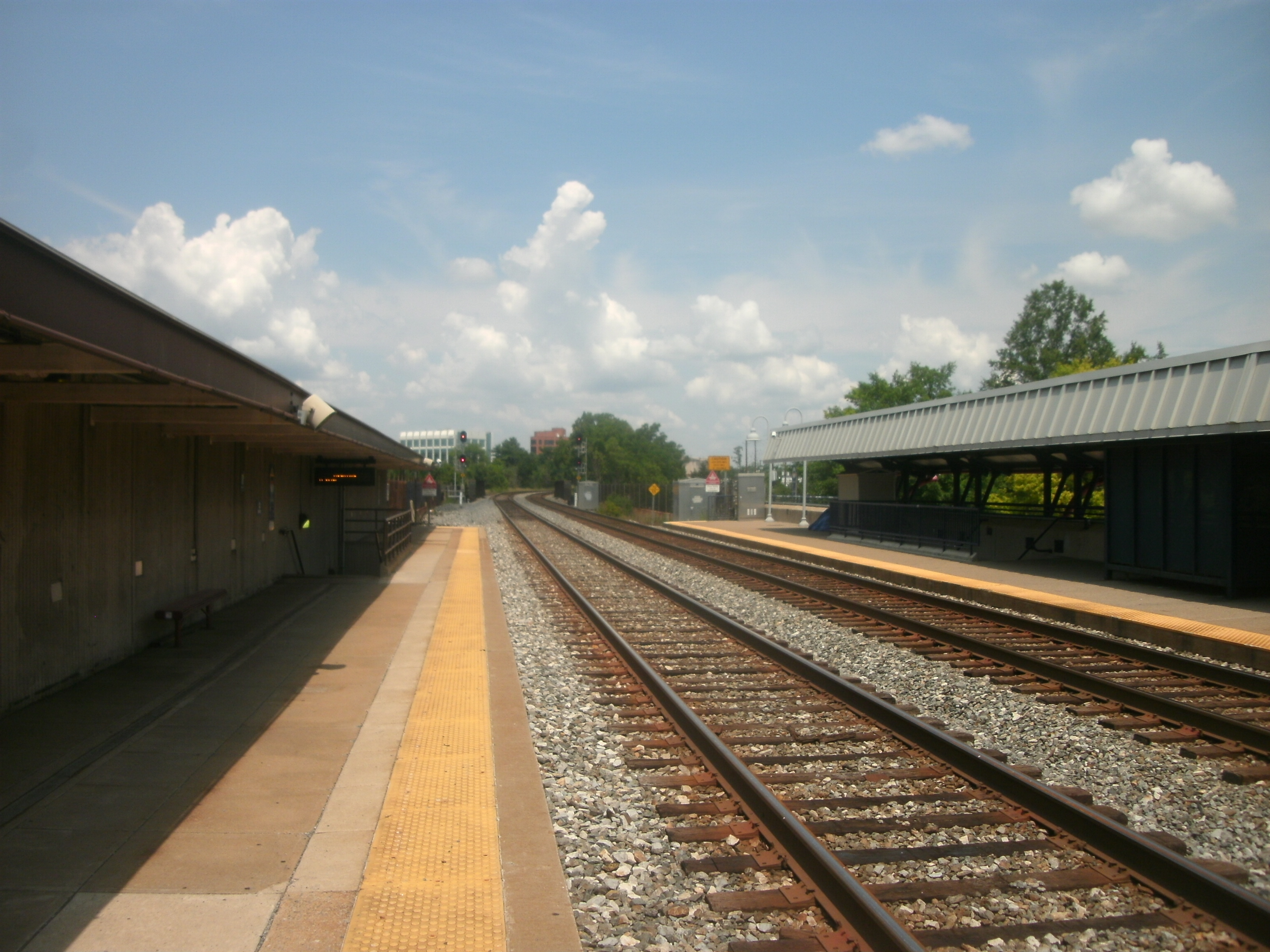
Amtrak/MARC platforms in July 2012

Rockville station is located on an embankment south of Park Road and east of Hungerford Drive and downtown Rockville. The two tracks of Metro's Red Line are served by a single island platform. Just to the east are the two tracks of the CSX Metropolitan Subdivision, flanked by two low-level side platforms used by Amtrak and MARC. A pedestrian underpass provides access to the platforms from parking lots, bus bays, and kiss-and-ride lots on the east and west sides of the station. A footbridge over Hungerford Drive connects the west side of the station to the Montgomery County office buildings and Rockville Town Center.
