= Metropolitan Grove station =

Rail station in Gaithersburg, Maryland, United States

Metropolitan Grove
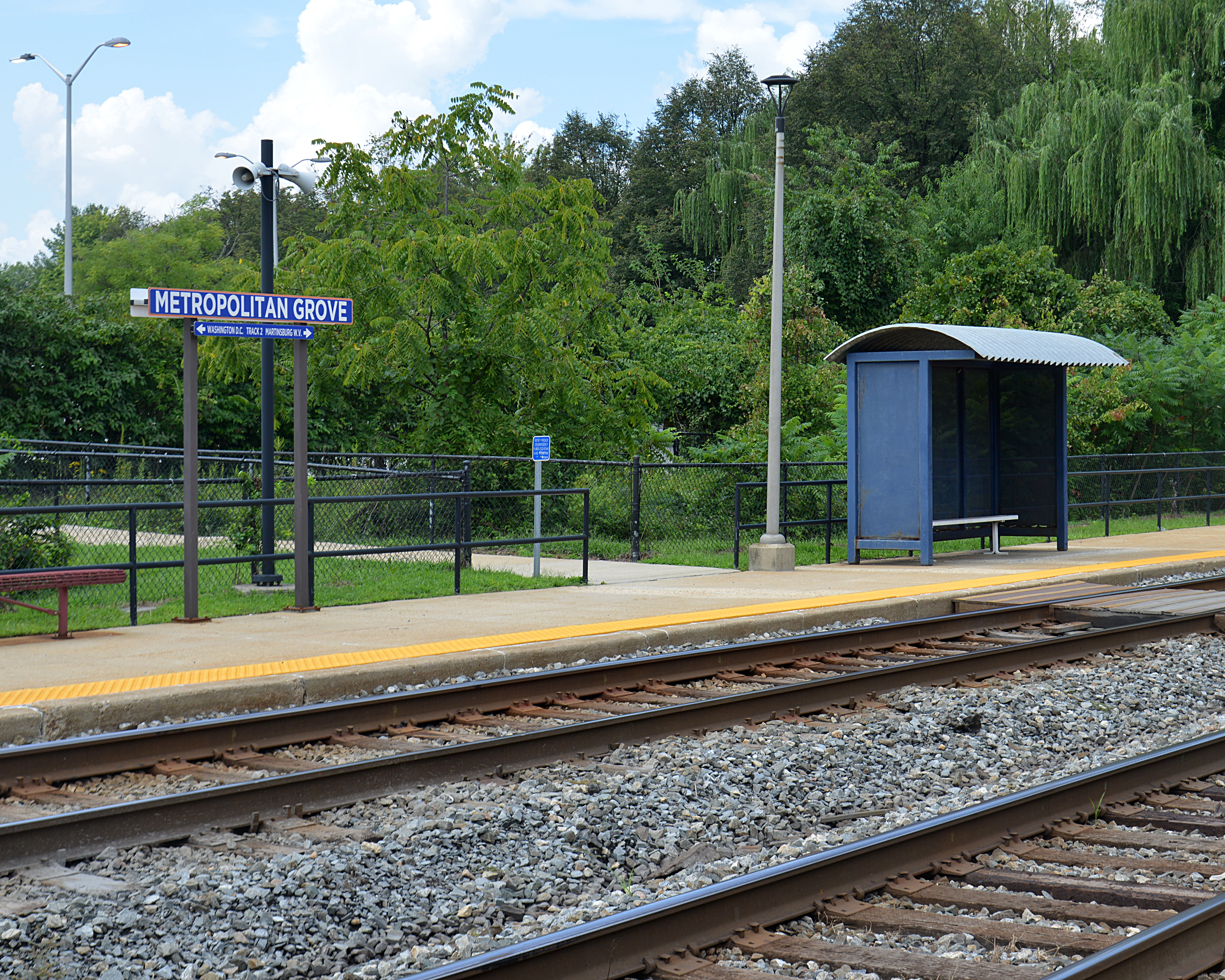
- Metropolitan Grove station in 2021

General information
- Location: 3 Metropolitan Court; Gaithersburg, Maryland
- Coordinates: 39°08′59″N 77°13′36.6″W
- Line: Metropolitan Subdivision
- Platforms: 2 side platforms
- Tracks: 2

Construction
- Parking: Yes
- Accessible: No

History
- Opened: July 6, 1987

Passengers
- November 2022: 79 (daily) (MARC)

Services
Preceding station	MARC	Following station
Germantown toward Martinsburg or Frederick	Brunswick Line	Gaithersburg toward Union Station
Germantown toward Brunswick	Brunswick Line limited service	Gaithersburg toward Camden Station
Location

Metropolitan Grove station is a passenger rail station in Gaithersburg, Maryland on the MARC Brunswick Line. The Brunswick line runs between Washington, D.C. and Martinsburg, WV (with an extension to Frederick, MD). Metropolitan Grove Station is adjacent to Brown Station Park. The large Watkins Mill Town Center development is adjacent and still under construction.

A proposed bus rapid transit line, the Corridor Cities Transitway (CCT), would connect with MARC at Metropolitan Grove. Construction of the CCT project is not funded as of 2025.

== Station layout ==
The station is not compliant with the Americans with Disabilities Act of 1990, lacking raised platforms for level boarding.
