= Washington Grove station =

MARC rail station in Washington Grove, Maryland, United States

Washington Grove
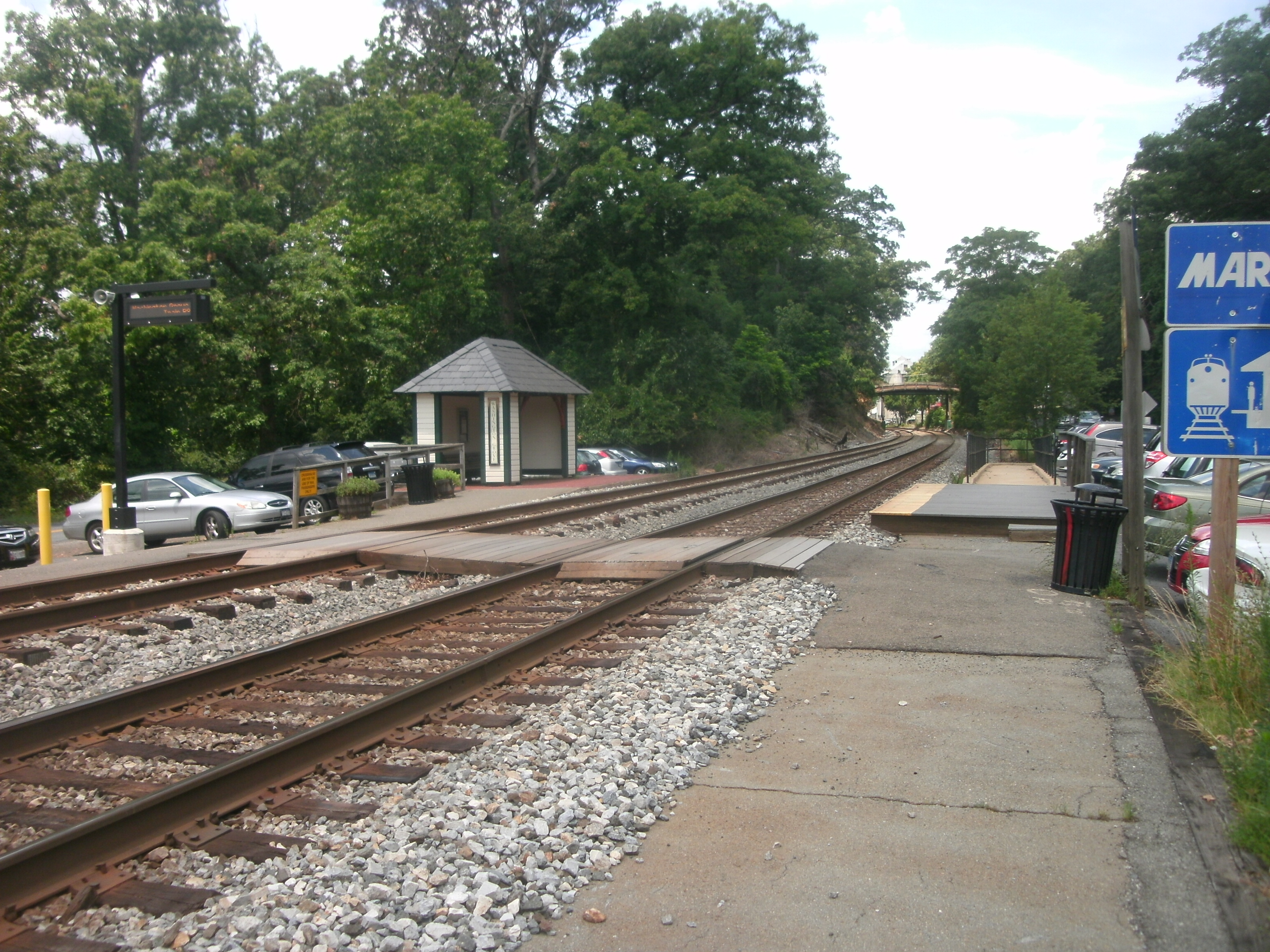
- The station at Washington Grove in July 2012

General information
- Location: 100 Railroad Street, Washington Grove, Maryland
- Coordinates: 39°08′11″N 77°10′39.5″W
- Line: Metropolitan Subdivision
- Platforms: 2 side platforms
- Tracks: 2

Construction
- Parking: Yes
- Accessible: No

History
- Opened: May 1, 1873 (ceremonial opening); May 25, 1873 (regular passenger service)

Passengers
- November 2022: 15 (daily) (MARC)

Services
Preceding station	MARC	Following station
Gaithersburg toward Martinsburg or Frederick	Brunswick Line	Rockville toward Union Station
Former services
Preceding station	Baltimore and Ohio Railroad	Following station
Gaithersburg toward Chicago	Main Line	Rockville toward Jersey City
Gaithersburg toward Chicago	Main Line	Derwood toward Jersey City
Location

Washington Grove is a passenger rail station in Washington Grove, Maryland, on MARC Train's Brunswick Line.

The station serves a historic community near Washington, D.C. that was a summer retreat for many of its citizens during the nineteenth and twentieth centuries, which recently have become year-round residences without destroying the outward appearance of the original structures in the community. Originally the rail connection provided the transportation to the community, which is designed only for pedestrian use along footpaths.

== Station layout ==
The station is not compliant with the Americans with Disabilities Act of 1990, lacking raised platforms for level boarding.
