= Dalecarlia (disambiguation) =

Dalecarlia or Dalarna is a historical province in Sweden.

It can also refer to the following geographic locations:

- Dalälven or Dalecarlia River, in Sweden
- Dalecarlia Reservoir, in Washington DC, United States
- Dalecarlia Tunnel, in Washington DC, United States
- Lake Dalecarlia, Indiana, census-designated place in United States
