= Herbert Wells Ice Arena =

Arena in College Park, Maryland

Herbert Wells Ice Rink
- Interactive map of Herbert Wells Ice Rink
- Location: College Park, Maryland, U.S.
- Coordinates: 38°58′34″N 76°55′23″W
- Operator: M-NCPPC
- Capacity: 600
- Surface: Ice

Website
- via pgparks.com

Herbert Wells Ice Arena is a 600-seat plus ice arena in College Park, Maryland. The facility includes a rink, an indoor warming room and party room, and a snack bar. The rink is open for ice skating seasonally, from October through March. The arena is managed by the Maryland-National Capital Park and Planning Commission and is named after a former civic leader who was an M-NCPPC member and a College Park city councilman.
