= Gaithersburg station =

MARC rail station in Gaithersburg, Maryland, United States

Gaithersburg
- Gaithersburg station

General information
- Location: 5 South Summit Avenue Gaithersburg, Maryland
- Coordinates: 39°08′29.5″N 77°11′35″W
- Line: CSX Metropolitan Subdivision
- Platforms: 2 side platforms
- Tracks: 2
- Connections: MTA Maryland: 201 and 202

Construction
- Parking: Garage
- Accessible: Yes

History
- Opened: May 1, 1873 (ceremonial opening); May 25, 1873 (regular passenger service)
- Rebuilt: 1884

Passengers
- November 2022: 121 (daily) (MARC)

Services
Preceding station	MARC	Following station
Metropolitan Grove toward Martinsburg or Frederick	Brunswick Line	Washington Grove toward Union Station
Metropolitan Grove toward Brunswick	Brunswick Line limited service	Rockville toward Camden Station
Former services
Preceding station	Amtrak	Following station
Brunswick toward Martinsburg	Blue Ridge Discontinued 1986	Rockville toward Washington, D.C.
Brunswick toward Cincinnati (River Road)	Shenandoah Discontinued 1981	Rockville toward Washington, D.C.
Preceding station	Baltimore and Ohio Railroad	Following station
Germantown toward Chicago	Main Line	Washington Grove toward Jersey City
Ward toward Chicago	Main Line	Washington Grove toward Jersey City
- Gaithersburg B & O Railroad Station and Freight Shed
- U.S. National Register of Historic Places
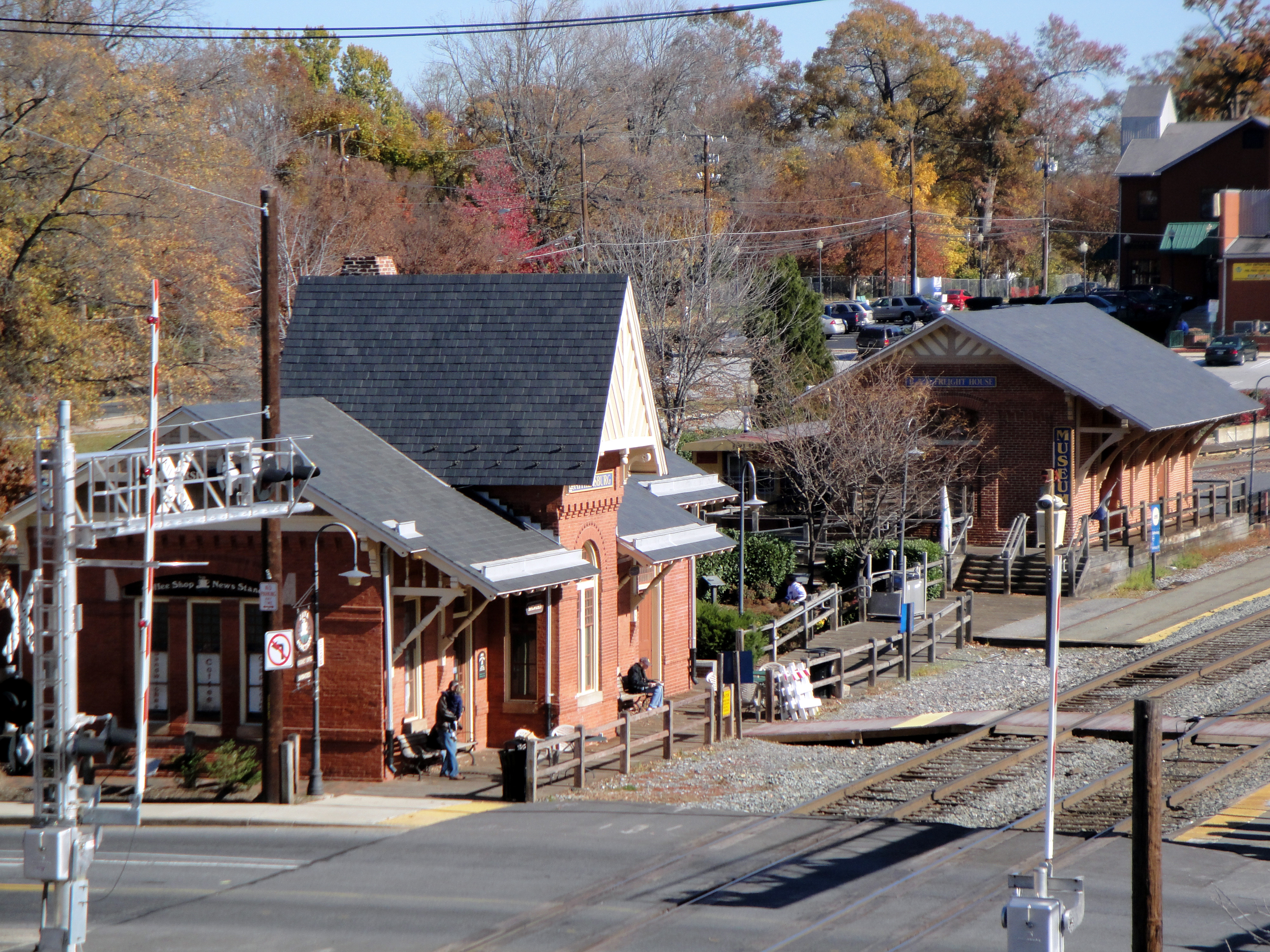
- Passenger station and freight house, November 2010
- Built: 1884
- Architect: Ephraim Francis Baldwin
- Architectural style: Queen Anne attributed
- NRHP reference No.: 78001473
- Added to NRHP: October 5, 1978
Location

Gaithersburg station is a commuter rail station located on the Metropolitan Subdivision in downtown Gaithersburg, Maryland. It is served by the MARC Brunswick Line service; it was also served by Amtrak from 1971 to 1986. The former Baltimore and Ohio Railroad station building and freight shed, designed by Ephraim Francis Baldwin and built in 1884, are listed on the National Register of Historic Places as Gaithersburg B & O Railroad Station and Freight Shed. They are used as the Gaithersburg Community Museum.

== History ==
The station was originally built in 1884 for the Metropolitan Branch of the Baltimore and Ohio Railroad (B&O). The station was designed by Ephraim Francis Baldwin, and consists of two historic buildings. The passenger station is a one-story common-bond brick structure with a gable roof. It is nearly identical in plan and dimensions to the Laurel, Maryland station Baldwin designed, also built in 1884, although the rooflines and settings are quite different. About 90 feet to the east of the station is the freight shed or loading dock, a brick structure about 45 ft × 20 ft. Its north and south facades are divided into six panels with a door in the second and fifth bays on both sides. The station was extended to the east in 1905.

When Amtrak was established in 1971, B&O Passenger service was replaced by the Potomac Special, which itself was replaced by the Blue Ridge in 1973. From 1976 to 1981 it also served another Amtrak train called the Shenandoah. During that time, it was listed on the National Register of Historic Places in 1978 as Gaithersburg B & O Railroad Station and Freight Shed, and continued to serve Amtrak until 1986, when it was converted into a MARC station with the establishment of the Brunswick Line. Now, instead of using the platform to unload passengers, they let off passengers on the road right next to the station, although sometimes when the train is long the conductor puts an additional exit next to the platform. A modern parking garage and pedestrian overpass can be found on the opposite side of South Summit Avenue. The garage was completed in 2000, with the pedestrian bridge finished the next year.

=== Gaithersburg Community Museum ===
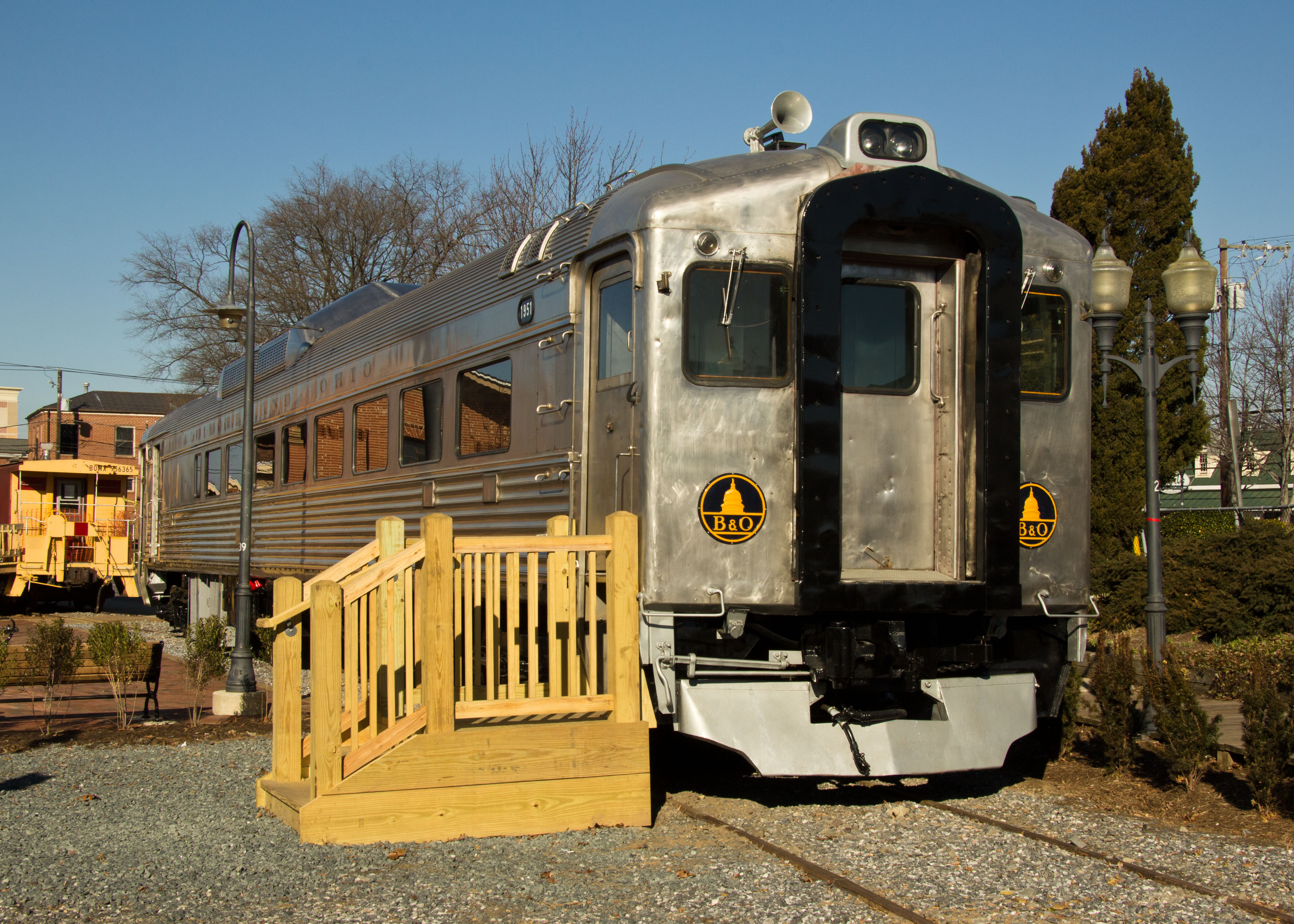
A former B&O Budd RDC car on display near the station

The Gaithersburg Community Museum is located in the restored 1884 B&O Railroad Station complex, and includes the freight house, a history park and a caboose. The museum features exhibits about the city's history, as well as historic railroad artifacts and equipment.

The Buffalo Creek and Gauley Railroad steam locomotive Consolidation #14, along with a caboose and a Budd RDC are on display in front of the freight shed.
