= Dalecarlia Tunnel =

Former railroad tunnel that carries the Capital Crescent Trail in Brookmont, Maryland

Coordinates: 38.943548°N 77.115794°W

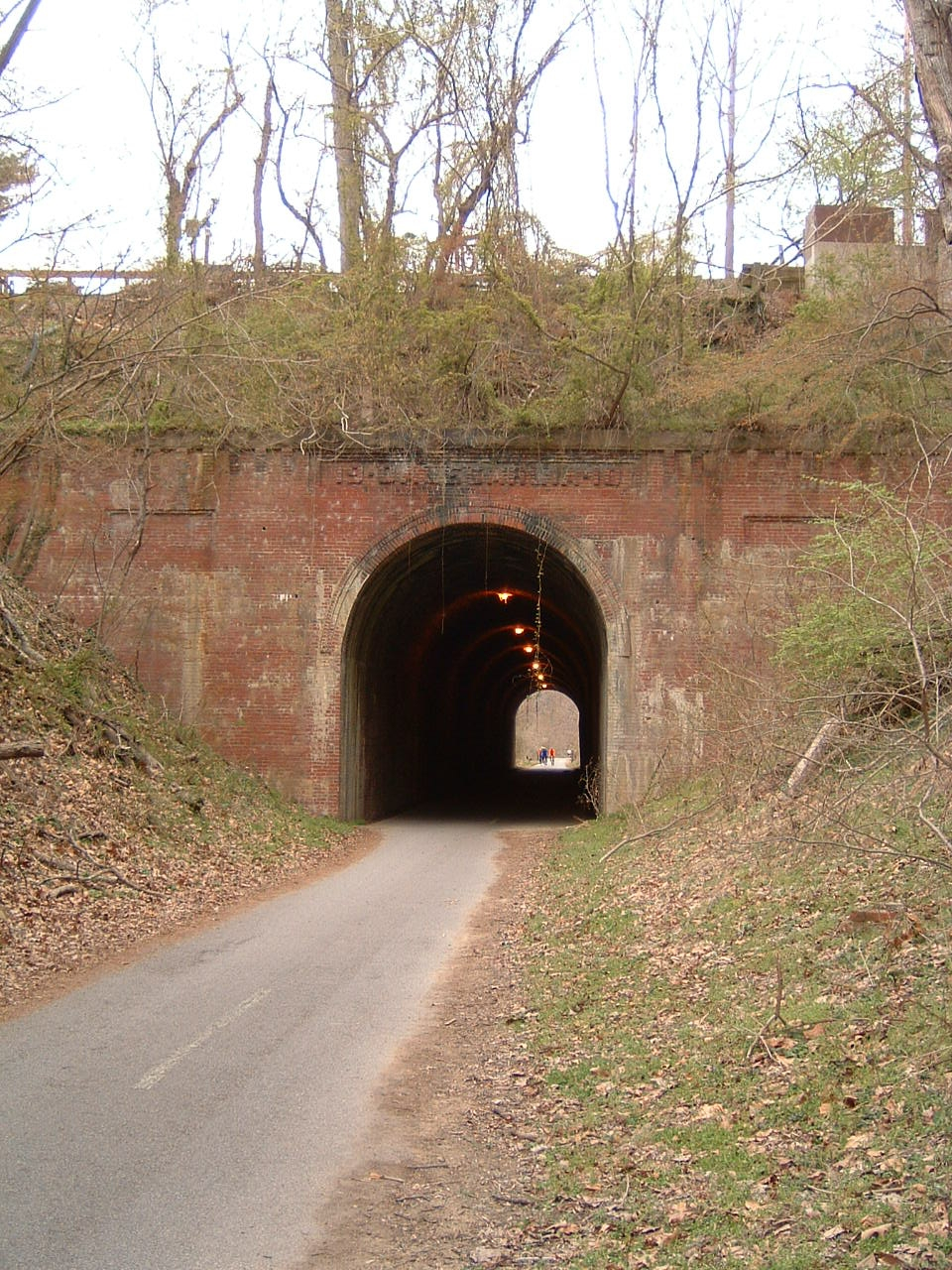
The Dalecarlia Tunnel, part of the Capital Crescent Trail

The Dalecarlia Tunnel in Brookmont, Maryland, near Washington, D.C., is a former railroad tunnel that presently carries the Capital Crescent Trail underneath MacArthur Boulevard and the Washington Aqueduct.

The tunnel was built in 1910 as part of the Georgetown Branch of the Baltimore and Ohio Railroad (B&O). It is a Roman arch tunnel, measuring 18 feet (5.5 m) wide by 341 feet (104 m) long. It features decorative brick facings on both ends and is lined with brick throughout its length.

CSX Transportation, the successor to the B&O Railroad, ceased train operations through the tunnel in 1985 and officially abandoned the rail line in 1986. The trail opened for public use in 1996. In 2023 Montgomery Parks improved the lighting in the tunnel.

== See also ==
- Metropolitan Subdivision - CSX Transportation
