= Metropolitan Railroad (Maryland) =

19th-century railway corporation

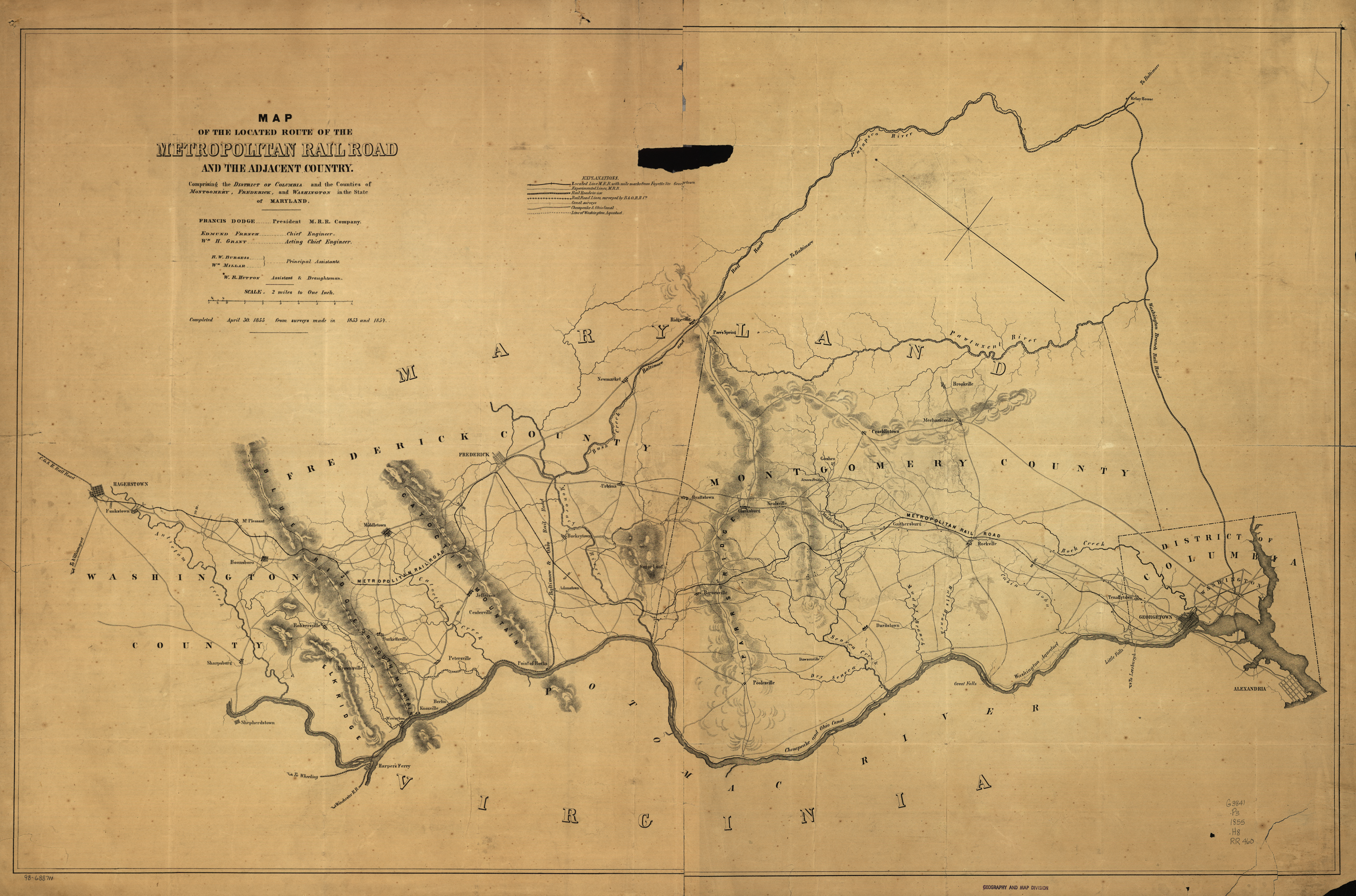
An 1855 map of the proposed route of the Metropolitan Railroad

The Metropolitan Railroad was a 19th-century Maryland corporation that proposed to build a railroad line from Washington, D.C., to the vicinity of Frederick, Maryland, where it would connect with the Baltimore and Ohio Railroad (B&O), and continue to Hagerstown. The company was organized by businessmen from Washington and Montgomery County, Maryland, and was chartered by the Maryland General Assembly in 1853. It conducted some initial land surveys, but had difficulty raising funds and went bankrupt in 1863. The B&O subsequently constructed a rail line on a similar route, and opened its Metropolitan Branch in 1873.
