= 1906 Washington, D.C., train wreck =

Train wreck at Terra Cotta Station

Coordinates: 38.951777°N 77.002174°W

1906 Washington, D.C. train wreck

Details
- Date: December 30, 1906; 119 years ago 6:31 pm
- Location: Terra Cotta station, near Brookland (Washington, D.C.)
- Country: United States
- Line: Metropolitan Branch
- Operator: Baltimore and Ohio Railroad
- Incident type: Rear collision
- Cause: Signal passed at danger

Statistics
- Trains: 2
- Passengers: 200
- Deaths: 53

The 1906 Washington, D.C. train wreck occurred on the Metropolitan Branch of the Baltimore and Ohio Railroad (B&O) at Terra Cotta station in Washington, D.C., on December 30, 1906, at 6:31 in the evening, when a locomotive pulling six empty cars crashed into the back of a passenger train in dense fog, killing 53 people and injuring more than 70.

== Accident ==
The local train, consisting of three wooden cars, was traveling from Frederick, Maryland, and was fifteen minutes late. It was just pulling out of Terra Cotta station (near the site of the current Fort Totten Metro station) when it was struck from behind by a "special equipment train", No 2120, traveling at full speed, about 65 mph (105 km/h). The heavy locomotive, which sustained very little damage, ploughed through the rear two cars, sending bodies and debris flying for a quarter of a mile on both sides of the track.

The accident is described in the book Undergraduate Days 1904-1908 by Frank Kuntz, recounted by a fellow student at the nearby Catholic University of America: "Then came a terrible noise which he described as a combination of an explosion, escaping steam, breaking wood, groaning brakes and human screams. It was so loud it could be heard on the campus and all over Brookland".

== Aftermath ==
According to The New York Times, "One of the cars of the wrecked train was split in two and left in halves on either side of the track. The butchery of the passengers was one of the most frightful things in the history of railroading. They were cut into pieces and portions of their bodies scattered all along the track" Small fragments of remains from several victims were commingled on their delivery to a local morgue; these commingled remains were buried in a single grave at Glenwood Cemetery with one monument, the expense paid by the B&O. The five crewmembers, Harry H. Hildebrand (engineer), Ira C. McClelland (fireman), Ralph Rutter (brakeman), Frank S. Hoffmeir (conductor) and William A. Norris (baggagemaster), of the train that hit the passenger train were all arrested at the scene.

Despite its nearness to the capital, Terra Cotta station was an isolated place, just serving a few houses of employees of the nearby Potomac Terra Cotta Company. The first help came from Brookland about a mile away, and it took nearly an hour for a relief train to arrive from Washington to begin taking away the dead and injured (and a further hour before it departed).

== Causes ==
The entire Metropolitan branch operated by the "absolute block system", which should have prevented any other train from entering a "block" of track when it is occupied. The empty train should have been stopped at Takoma Park until the passenger train had moved out of the block at University. The operator at Takoma Park stated that his signal lights were burning red ("danger") when the empty train passed, corroborated by three other people. The engineer claimed he slowed down and looked for the signal, but could not see it. In such a situation he should have stopped, and yet he continued running at great speed. The operator immediately telegraphed the operator at University station: "No. 2120 has gone by my red light, going like hell". The tower operator at University station confirmed that he received the message.

One misunderstanding that contributed in large part to the disaster was that Takoma Park station was closed between 6:30 pm and 6:30 am each day, when no signals would have been displayed; in these circumstances the previous block (controlled by signals at Silver Spring) extends beyond Terra Cotta. No. 2120 had received a clear signal from Silver Spring, so the engineer believed he was cleared through to University. Further inquiries also revealed that the engineer had been on almost continuous duty for 33 hours and had not had a full night's sleep for 57 hours.

Four men were charged with manslaughter — the engineer, conductor, brakeman and fireman of train 2120 — but after a lengthy trial all were found not guilty due to lack of evidence. Nonetheless, the Interstate Commerce Commission blamed them, claiming all were negligent. It did reserve some criticism for management, though having received "evidence indicating that the railroads have overworked and poorly paid men manning these safety devices and that, in the effort to rush traffic, men on trains are encouraged to be careless about heeding danger signals". The ICC also banned wooden body passenger car construction.
