= Shenandoah (Amtrak train) =

Former Amtrak train between Washington, DC, and Cincinnati, OH

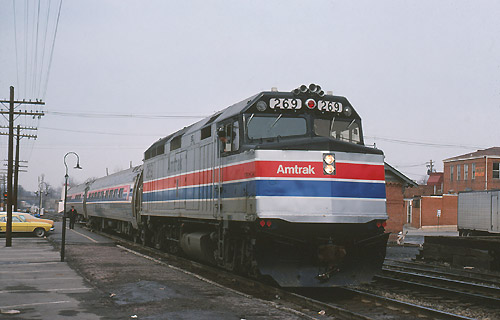
- The Shenandoah at Gaithersburg in March 1978

Overview
- Service type: Inter-city rail
- Status: Discontinued
- Locale: West Virginia
- First service: October 31, 1976
- Last service: September 30, 1981
- Successor: Capitol Limited
- Former operator: Amtrak

Route
- Termini: Washington; Cincinnati
- Stops: 18
- Distance travelled: 546 mi (878.70 km)
- Average journey time: 14 hours 28 minutes
- Service frequency: Daily
- Train number: 32, 33

On-board services
- Class: Unreserved coach
- Catering facilities: On-board café

Technical
- Rolling stock: Amfleet
- Track gauge: 4 ft 8 1/2 in (1,435 mm)
- Track owner: Baltimore & Ohio Railroad

The Shenandoah was a daily passenger train operated by Amtrak between Washington and Cincinnati from 1976 until 1981.

== History ==
The Shenandoah began operating on October 31, 1976. The name came from the Shenandoah, a Washington–Akron train operated by the Baltimore & Ohio Railroad until Amtrak took over the nation's passenger trains in 1971.

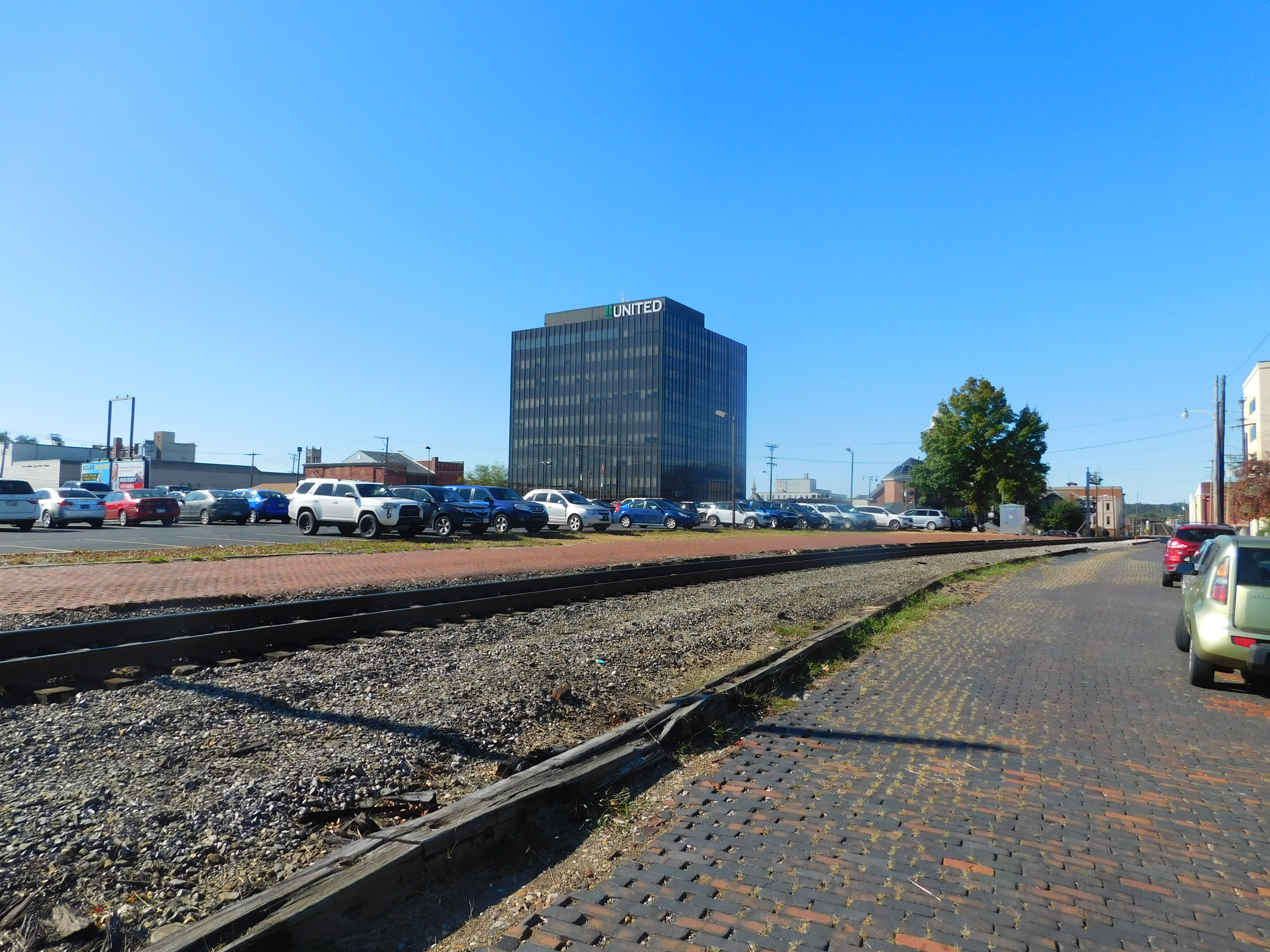
The former platform of the Parkersburg station once served by the Shenandoah

Connecting service at Cincinnati to Chicago was provided by the Mountaineer/James Whitcomb Riley until 1977, after which it was provided by the Cardinal.

Amtrak discontinued the Shenandoah on September 30, 1981, citing low ridership. Amtrak considered the Shenandoah one of its weakest lines, and the Department of Transportation had recommended its discontinuance in 1979. Service on the Washington–Cumberland segment of the Shenandoah was replaced by the new Washington–Pittsburgh–Chicago Capitol Limited. The Cincinnati–Cumberland portion never regained passenger rail service, and CSX subsequently abandoned much of the track.

== Equipment ==
The Shenandoah originally operated with Amfleet coaches and a cafe car; one or two coaches were used west of Martinsburg, with two additional coaches on the more-heavily-used segment between Martinsburg and Washington, D.C. The original GE P30CH locomotives were replaced by new EMD F40PH locomotives in 1977. Consists varied based on demand; many trains were just two to three cars long.

The 1978 switch to overnight service required the train to have sleeping facilities per Interstate Commerce Commission rules. Amtrak added two sleeping compartments each to a pair of Amfleet coaches (dubbed "Ampad"), which began service on May 3, 1978. A Congressional mandate resulted in a conventional 10-6 sleeper (10 roomettes and six double bedrooms) being added on October 28, 1979. The sleeper was removed on April 26, 1981.
