= Metropolitan Subdivision =

Railroad line in Washington, D.C. and Maryland, United States

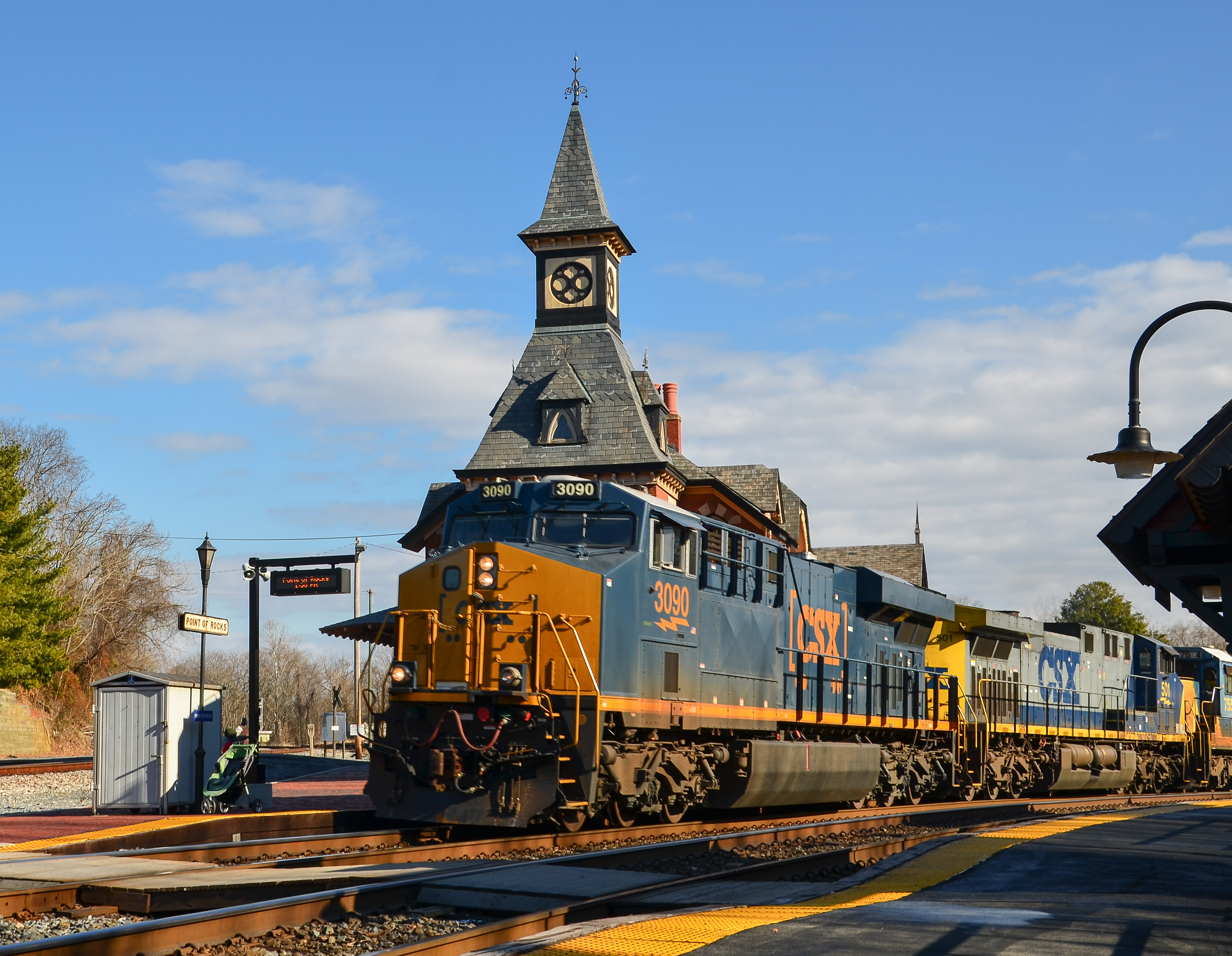
Westbound CSX autorack train on the Metropolitan Subdivision in Point of Rocks

Metropolitan Subdivision

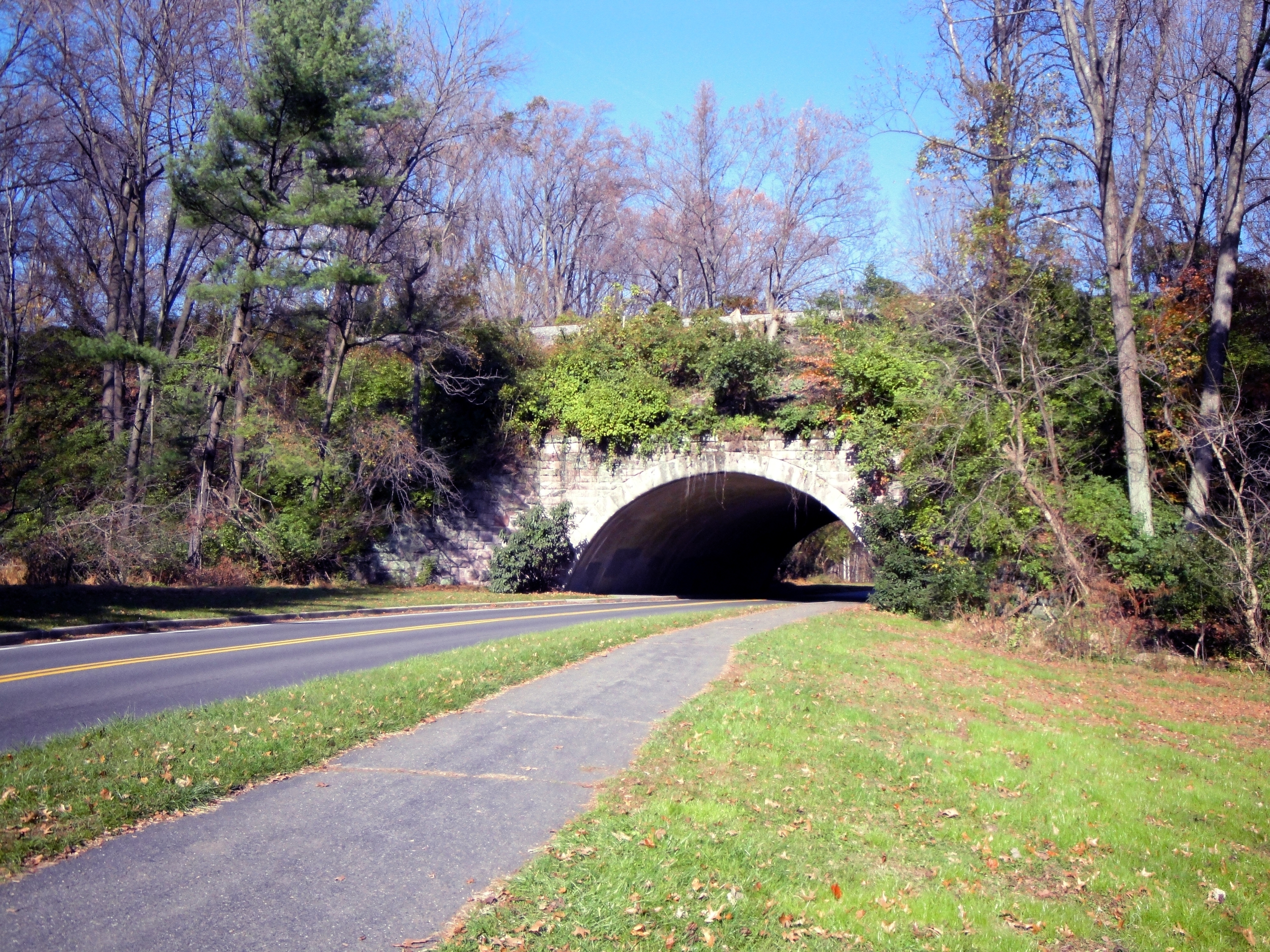
The stone arch railroad bridge built over the newly-diverted Rock Creek in 1893 now passes over Beach Drive and the bike path

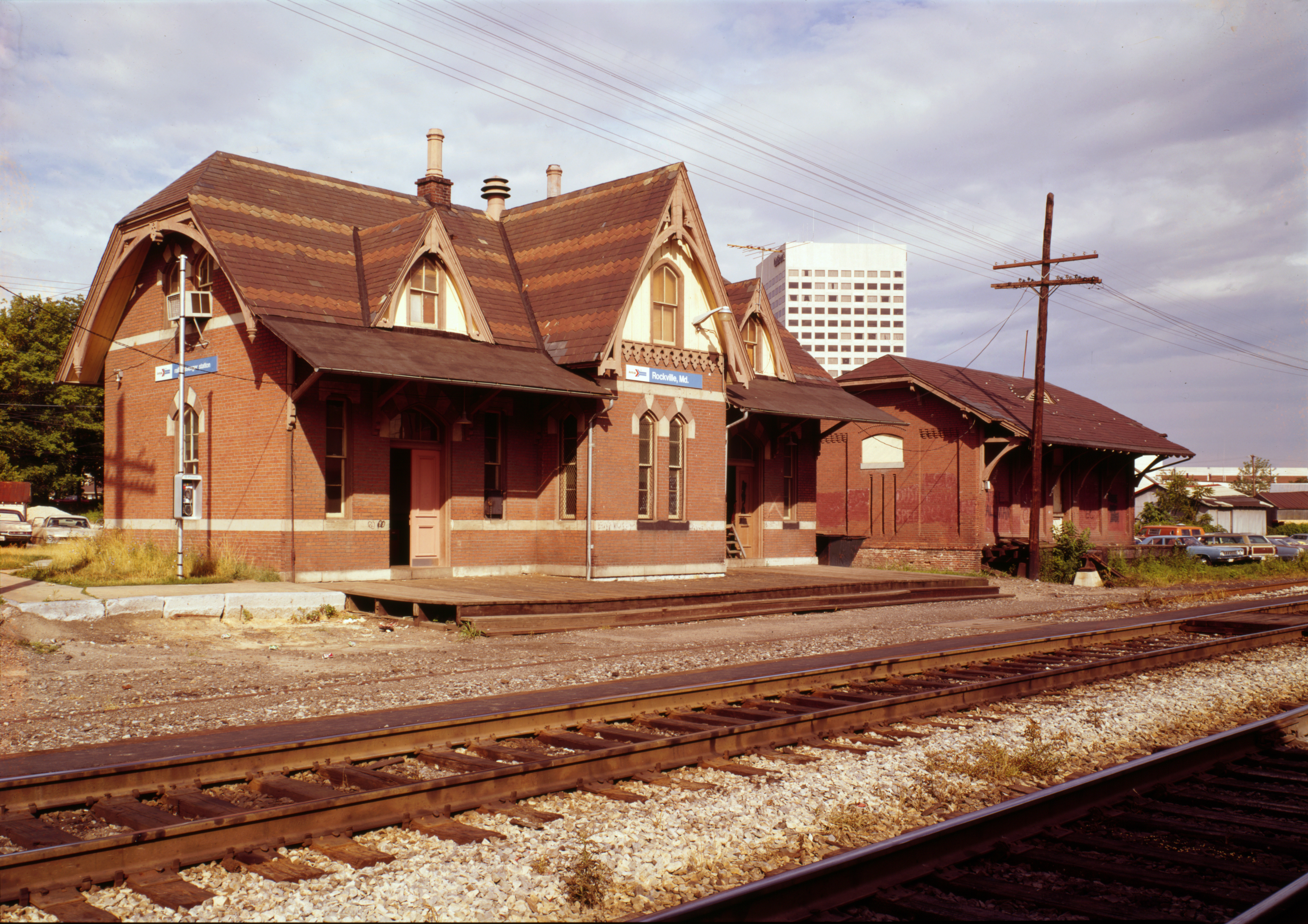
Rockville station in 1978, before it was moved away from the tracks

The Metropolitan Subdivision is a railroad line owned and operated by CSX Transportation in Washington, D.C., and Maryland. The 53-mile line runs from Washington, D.C., northwest to Weverton, Maryland, along the former Metropolitan Branch of the Baltimore and Ohio Railroad, opened in 1873.

At its southeast end, north of Washington Union Station, the Metropolitan Subdivision meets the Capital Subdivision (formerly the B&O's Washington Branch) and Amtrak's Northeast Corridor. It meets the Old Main Line Subdivision at Point of Rocks, Maryland. At its northwest end, at Weverton, the line joins the Cumberland Subdivision.

MARC Train's Brunswick Line uses the entire subdivision, as does Amtrak's Capitol Limited. The electrified tracks of the Red Line of the Washington Metro share the subdivision's right-of-way along two stretches: from the junction with the Capital Subdivision in D.C. to north of Silver Spring, Maryland, and from south of Twinbrook to the end of the Red Line at Shady Grove.

== History ==
Interest in building a rail line from Washington to points west was initially spurred by businessmen in Washington and Montgomery County, Maryland. In 1853, they obtained a corporate charter from the Maryland General Assembly to form the Metropolitan Railroad. The proposed line would run from Washington to the vicinity of Frederick, Maryland, where it would connect with the B&O main line, and continue to Hagerstown, Maryland. The company conducted some initial land surveys, but had difficulty raising funds and went bankrupt in 1863.

Two years later, the expired charter was taken over by the B&O, which had not previously been interested in building a new route out of Washington. Construction began in 1866 along a slightly different route, connecting with the main line at Point of Rocks, Maryland.

The line opened on April 30, 1873, as the B&O's Metropolitan Branch. The new line became the B&O's main passenger route to Washington, with the Old Main Line, from Point of Rocks to Relay, reduced to secondary status. Some through freight trains were also rerouted to the new line.

Increasing congestion led the B&O to start adding double track portions to the line in 1886. The Washington-to-Gaithersburg section was double-tracked by 1893. During the peak years of passenger operation—1893 to the 1920s—the line saw 18 trains per day, with as many as 28 stops along the Met Branch.

Double-tracking was completed on the remainder of the branch in 1928. Several distinctive passenger stations, designed by architect Ephraim Francis Baldwin, were constructed along the line. Original stations still stand in the Maryland communities of Rockville (moved away from the tracks in 1981), Kensington, Gaithersburg, Dickerson, and Point of Rocks.

In 1906, a rear collision at Terra Cotta station killed 53 people.

On February 16, 1996, the collision of two trains in Silver Spring killed three crew members and eight passengers and injured a total of 26 people.

=== Georgetown Branch ===
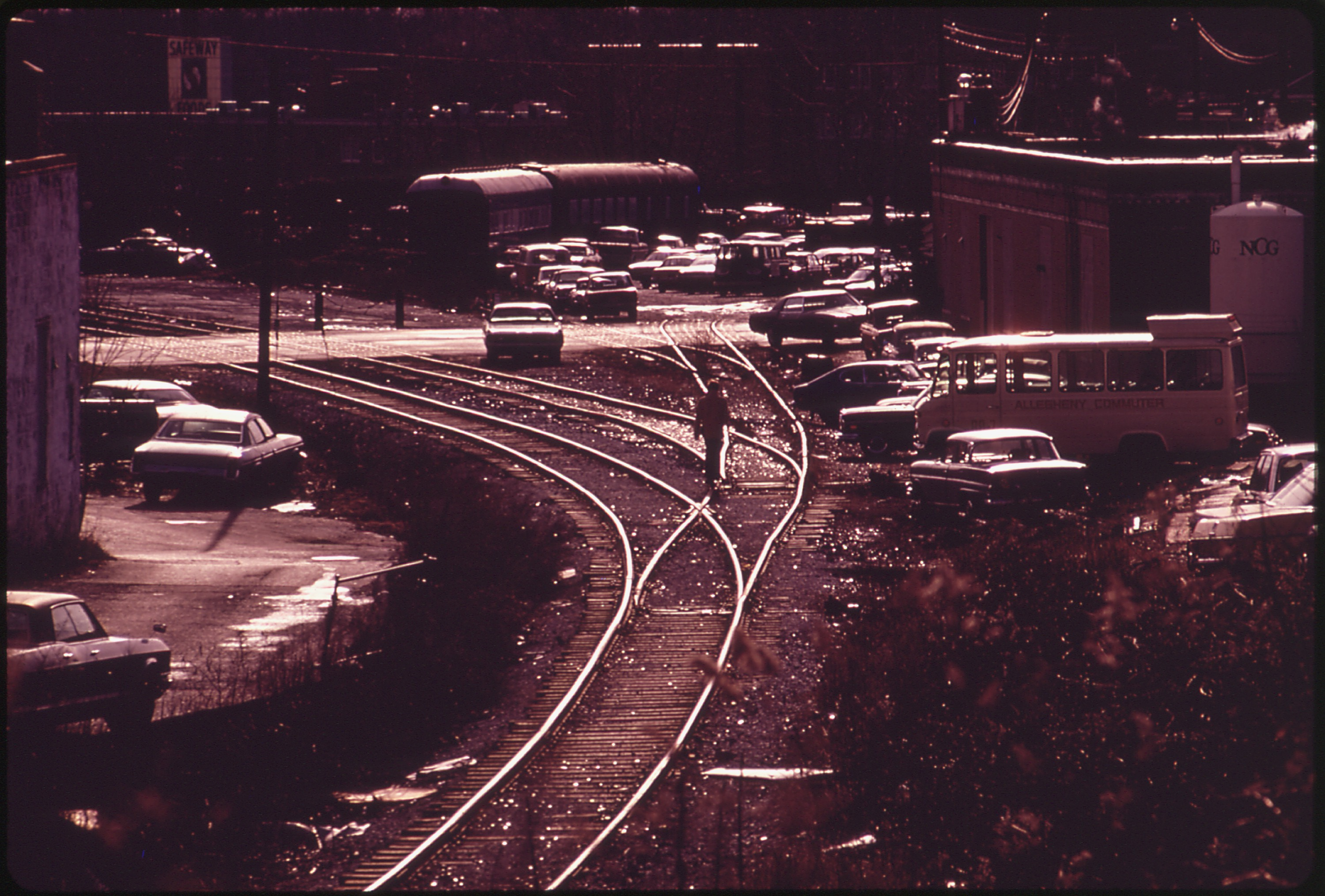
Georgetown Branch in Bethesda, Maryland, near where it crossed Bethesda Avenue

The Met Branch's 11-mile Georgetown Branch ran from a junction north of the Silver Spring station in a broad arc to the Georgetown area of Washington, D.C. The branch was built in two phases. The first, completed in 1892, ran along the northern bank of Coquelin Run to Connecticut Avenue, recently extended from downtown D.C. to foster the nascent development of Chevy Chase. The second phase completed the crescent to Georgetown in 1910.

Engineering features of the branch included the Rock Creek Trestle in Chevy Chase, the Dalecarlia Tunnel, and the Arizona Avenue Trestle, a through-truss bridge over the Chesapeake and Ohio Canal.

The line was originally intended to be a B&O extension that would cross the Potomac River near the Chain Bridge, but in 1904, the B&O reached an agreement with the Pennsylvania Railroad to use the Long Bridge over the Potomac, nearly six miles downstream. So the Georgetown Branch remained a spur serving local industries in Georgetown and the Maryland communities of Silver Spring, Chevy Chase, and Bethesda.

CSX ran its last train on the Georgetown Branch in 1985 after a bridge in Montgomery County was found to have structural problems, and launched the abandonment process the year after 75 feet of track was damaged in the 1985 Election Day floods.

The right-of-way from Bethesda to Georgetown was turned into a hike-and-bike trail that opened in late 1996 as the Capital Crescent Trail. The Bethesda-to-Silver Spring portion of the spur was opened in 1997 as an interim rail-trail called the Georgetown Branch Trail, and the two trails were connected in 1998. The railyard in Georgetown was developed into the Washington Harbour buildings and the Georgetown Waterfront Park.

In 2017, construction began on the Purple Line, a light rail line which will use the Bethesda-to-Silver Spring portion of the spur as part of a route that continues on to New Carrollton, Maryland. The Georgetown Branch Trail is to be rebuilt alongside the new tracks, which is projected for completion in late 2027.

Besides the right-of-way and bridges, remnants include the Dalecarlia Tunnel, the Air Rights Tunnel, rail sidings along the right-of-way near River Road and the enlarged arch of the Aqueduct Bridge abutment.

== Current operation ==
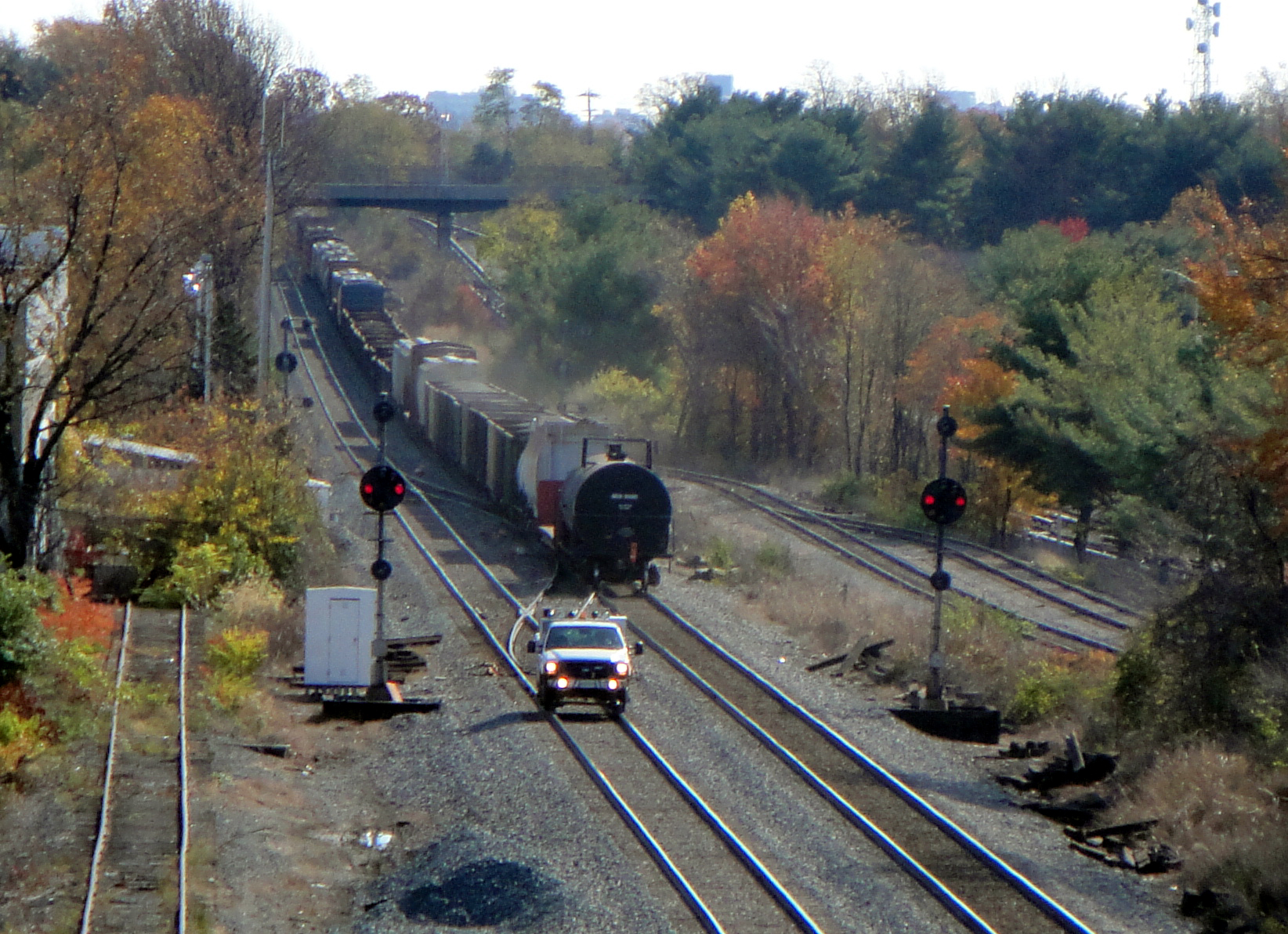
Freight train at Derwood interlocking heading east towards Washington, D.C.

Through mergers, the line became part of the CSX system in 1987. CSX organized its Metropolitan Subdivision as a combination of the original B&O Met Branch plus a section of the B&O original main line northwest of Point of Rocks, which had opened in 1834. The entire subdivision is signaled for bi-directional running. There is a spur in Maryland that serves the Dickerson Generating Station (formerly owned by the Potomac Electric Power Company (PEPCO)) (BA 37) at Dickerson and a trash-transfer facility spur in Derwood (BA 19.6). The interlockings on the line are (east to west): F Tower (BAA 37.2), QN Tower (BA 2.1), Georgetown Jct (BA 8.3), Montrose (BA 15), Derwood (BA 19.6), Clopper (BA 24.4), Buck Lodge (BA 30), Dickerson (BA 35.5), PEPCO (BA 37), Tuscarora (BA 39.3), East Rocks (BA 42.6), Point of Rocks (BA 42.8), East Brunswick (BA 73.1), WB Tower (75.6), and Weverton (78.8).

== Engineering features ==
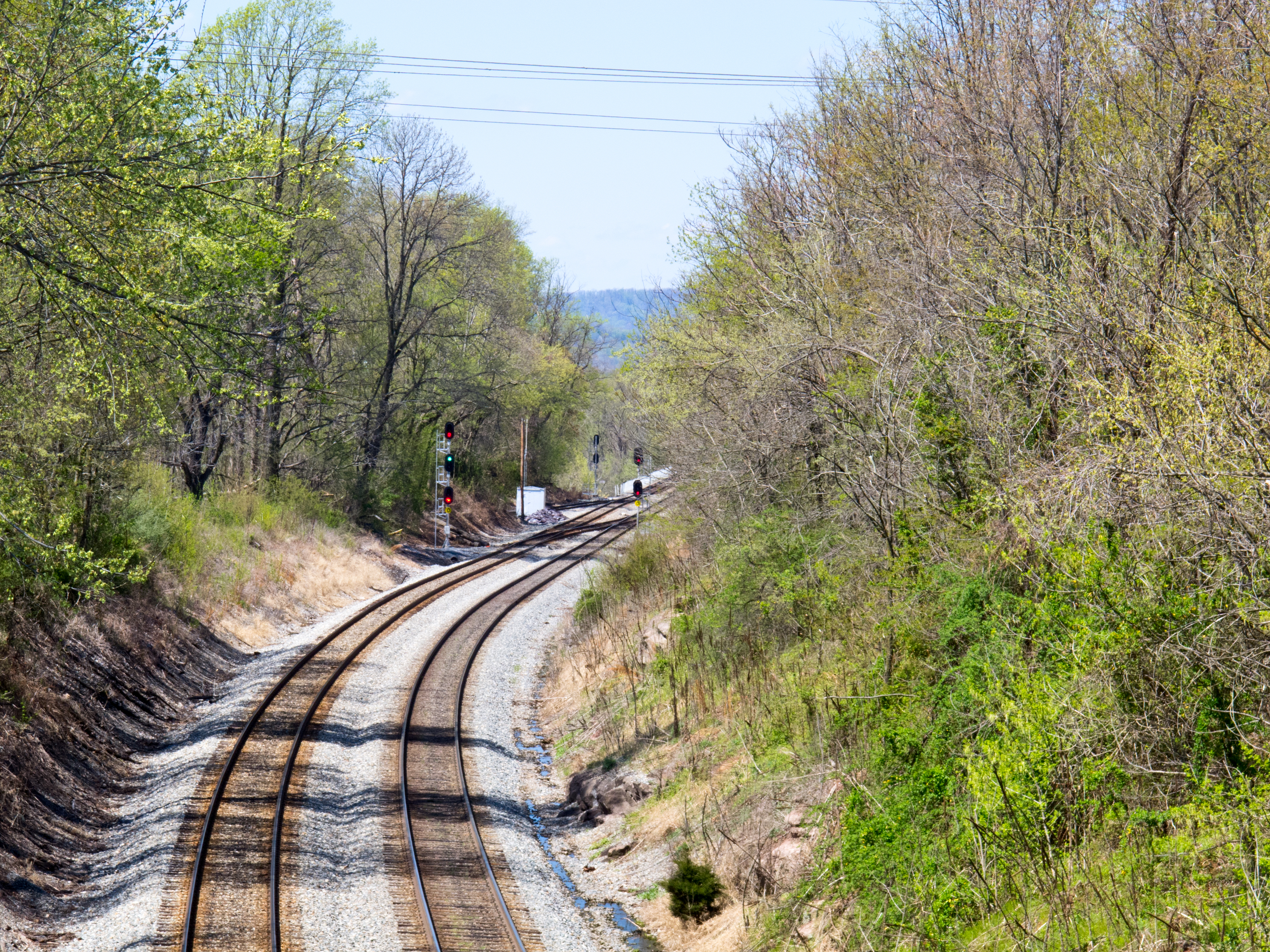
The Dickerson spur splits off to the left, while the Monocacy River is just beyond the curve.

The line's bridges cross:

- Tuscarora Creek. Originally a Bollman truss iron bridge, replaced with a girder bridge in 1904.
- Monocacy River. Originally a 700-foot-long (210 m) Bollman truss, replaced with a seven-span girder bridge in 1904.
- Little Monocacy River. Originally a 500-foot wood trestle, replaced by a 331-foot stone arch viaduct in 1906.
- Great Seneca Creek (Waring Viaduct). Originally a 400-foot-long (120 m) wood and iron trestle, replaced with an arch stone viaduct in 1906.
- Little Seneca Creek. Originally a timber bridge, replaced with a steel trestle in 1896, and then a concrete arch in 1928.
- Rock Creek. The original bridge consisted of four 100-ft Bollman trusses. In 1893, the main course of Rock Creek was diverted primarily upstream of the bridge. Before the diversion, a loop in the creek caused it to run almost parallel to the bridge. The realignment allowed the tracks to cross Rock Creek at a right angle. The Bollman trusses were replaced by a stone arch bridge from 1893-1896.

== See also ==
- List of CSX Transportation lines
