= Maryland-National Capital Park and Planning Commission =

Agency that administers parks and planning in Maryland

Maryland–National Capital Park and Planning Commission
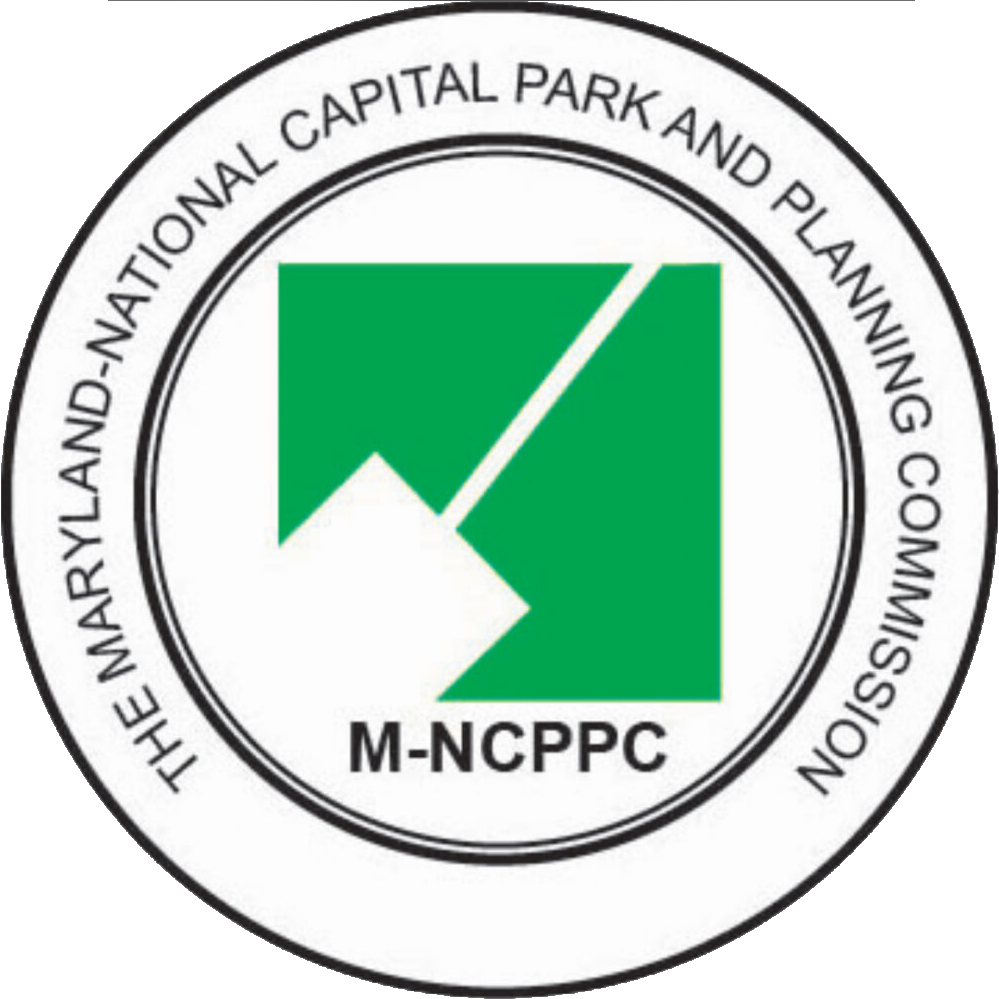
- Seal of the M-NCPPC

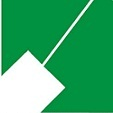
- Logo of the M–NCPPC

Agency overview
- Formed: 1927; 99 years ago
- Type: State
- Jurisdiction: Montgomery County, Maryland; Prince George's County, Maryland
- Headquarters: 1616 McCormick Dr, Upper Marlboro, Maryland, 20774; 38°58′09″N 76°54′58″W
- Annual budget: US$456 million (2017)
- Agency executives: Artie Harris, Chair; Vacant, Vice-Chair
- Website: www.mncppc.org

The Maryland–National Capital Park and Planning Commission (M–NCPPC) is a state agency that administers parks and planning in Montgomery and Prince George's counties in Maryland.

== History ==
The commission was formed in 1927 by the Maryland General Assembly (Chapter 448, Acts of 1927). Since 1970, the commission also has operated the Prince George's County recreation program, funded by a separate countywide recreation tax. In addition, the commission provides services and educational programs relating to conservation and nature, local history, and the arts, and offers recreation classes. The commission successfully defended the constitutionality of its maintaining the Bladensburg Peace Cross before the Supreme Court of the United States in American Legion v. American Humanist Association (2019).

== Organization and functions ==
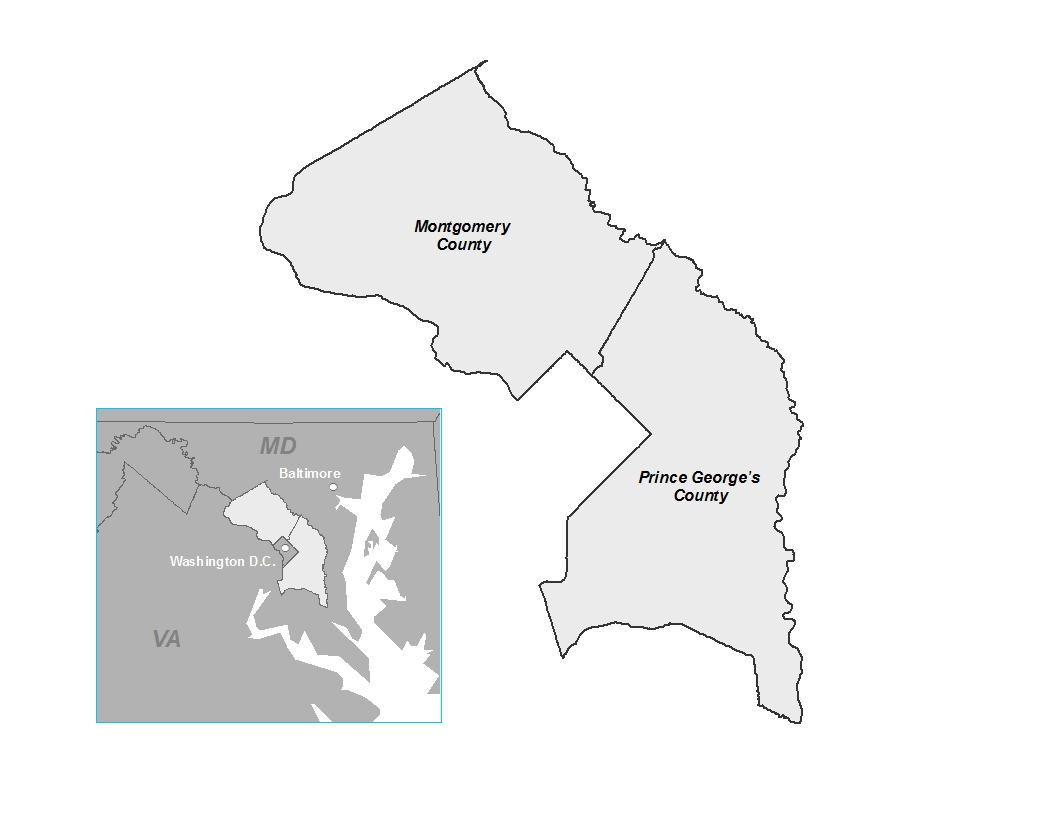
Map of M–NCPPC Region

The commission is divided into seven departments, two for Montgomery county: the Department of Parks and the Department of Planning; two for Prince George's County: the Department of Parks and Recreation and the Department of Planning; and three that are cross-county: the Department of Human Resource Management, the Department of Finance, and the Office of the General Counsel. While these counties and departments are all within one commission, day-to-day operations, for the most part, are separate. Interaction among general staff across counties and departments is rare.

== Parks ==
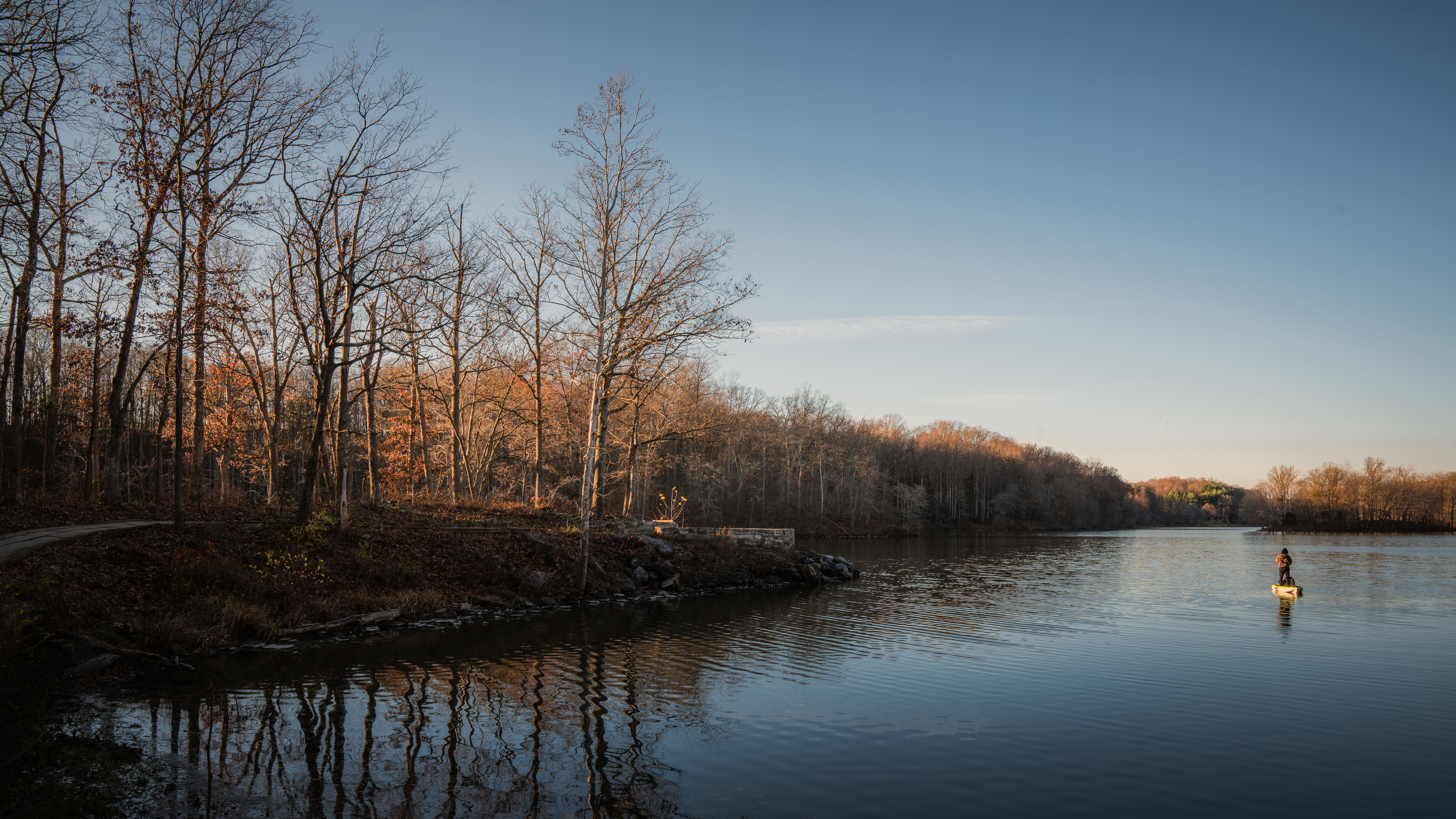
Lake Needwood in Rock Creek Regional Park

The commission manages over 52,000 acres (210 km^{2}) of parks in the two counties. Within the Maryland–Washington Metropolitan District, the commission is empowered to acquire, develop, maintain, and operate parks systems. In all areas except Laurel, the Commission may spend public funds to acquire park land. Subject to county government approval, it also may sell general obligation bonds to fund park acquisition and development. All other expenses, including debt service, are paid from a park tax levied within the District.

Prince George's Stadium in Bowie is built on park property.

== Planning ==
Taking into account all factors of urban, suburban, rural and regional planning, the commission prepares and administers a General Plan for the physical development of the Maryland–Washington Regional District. All of Prince George's County (except Laurel) and all of Montgomery County (except Rockville, Gaithersburg, and several small municipalities) are included in the district. For the portion of the district within their county, each planning board makes zoning recommendations to its county council. To enact zoning ordinances and change the zoning map, the planning boards have exclusive responsibility for subdivision approval, location and grades of streets, location of public buildings and utilities, and street naming and house numbering. Administration and operating expenses of the commission are financed by property taxes levied by the two counties.

== Park Police ==
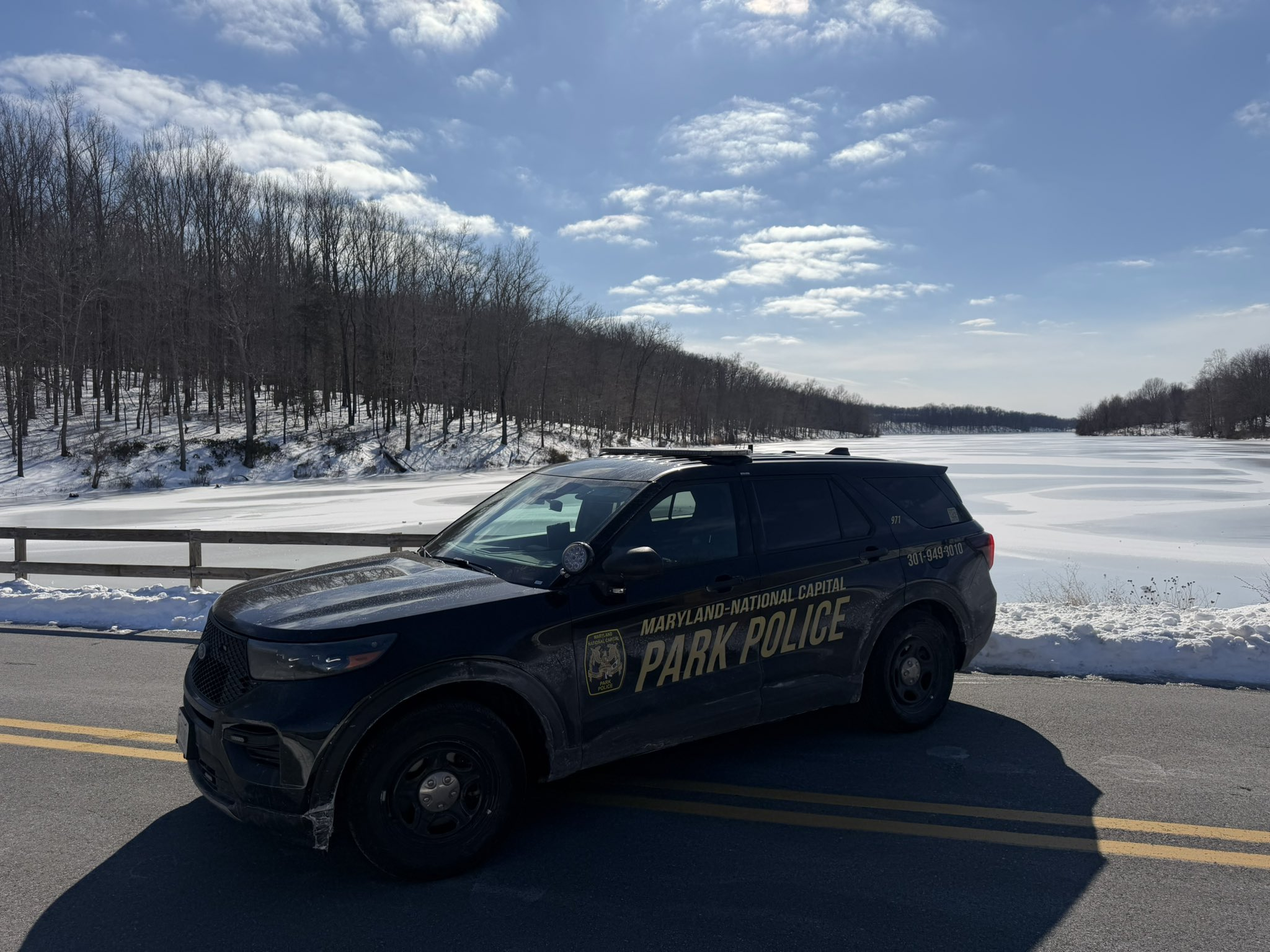
Ford Police Interceptor of the Park Police at Black Hill Regional Park

The Maryland–National Capital Park Police (MNCPP or MDPP) is the law enforcement arm of the Maryland–National Capital Park and Planning Commission (M‑NCPPC), a bi‑county agency responsible for providing law enforcement services in the park systems and recreation centers in Montgomery County and Prince George’s County, Maryland.

The Park Police was established by state legislation in 1954 to provide dedicated policing services for parkland and facilities managed by the Commission. It operates as a full‑service police agency with full law enforcement authority in both counties, possessing the same powers and jurisdiction as the Prince George’s County and Montgomery County police departments. In the early 2000s, the Prince George's County Division of the Park Police had approximately 98 sworn officers and 25 civilian employees. By 2007 it had grown to 102 sworn officers.

The agency routinely provides mutual aid and supplemental support to local, state, and federal law enforcement partners throughout the National Capital Region. Park Police officers have been deployed to assist outside agencies during large-scale events and major civil disturbances, including supporting the Baltimore Police Department during the 2015 Baltimore protests, presidential inaugurations in Washington, D.C., providing security and law enforcement support for NFL games and large‑scale events held at Northwest Stadium, and for events at the University of Maryland such as college football games. The Park Police also routinely work alongside federal law enforcement agencies including the United States Capitol Police and the United States Park Police by providing an additional law enforcement presence at major events in Washington D.C. such as presidential inaugurations and the Occupy D.C. protests.

Officers patrol continuously on a 24‑hour basis using a variety of methods, including marked patrol vehicles, foot patrol, bicycle units, motorcycles, and all‑terrain vehicles, allowing access to remote and wooded areas that are not reachable by traditional police vehicles.

=== Special Operations Section ===
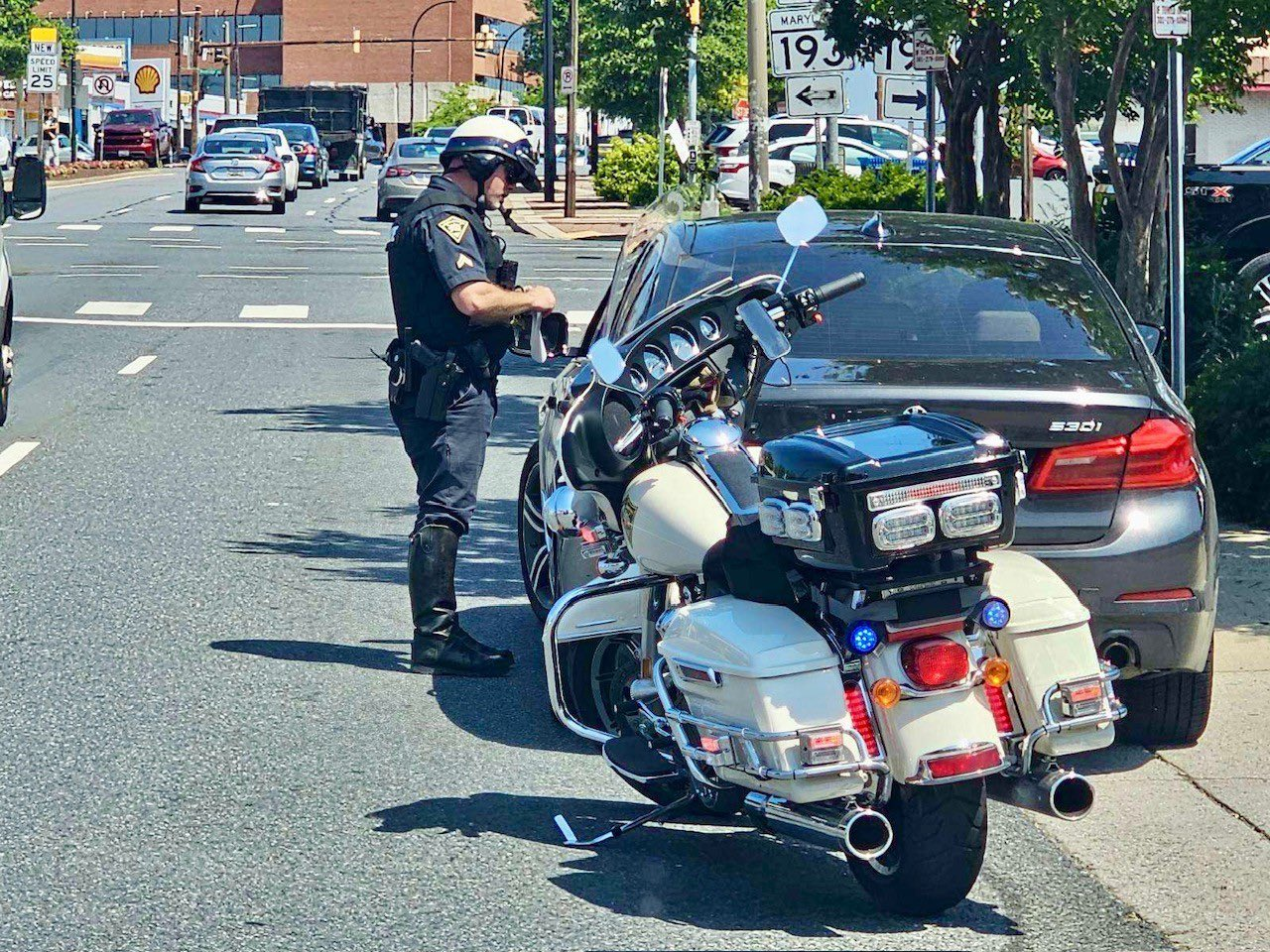
A Maryland-National Capital Police Harley Davidson Motorcycle

In addition to routine patrol functions, the agency maintains a broad range of specialized operational capabilities comparable to other municipal police departments. Its Special Operations Section includes mounted patrol units, with horse‑mounted officers deployed for crowd control, high‑visibility patrol, and major event policing, as well as marine patrol units responsible for lakes, rivers, and other waterways within Commission property.

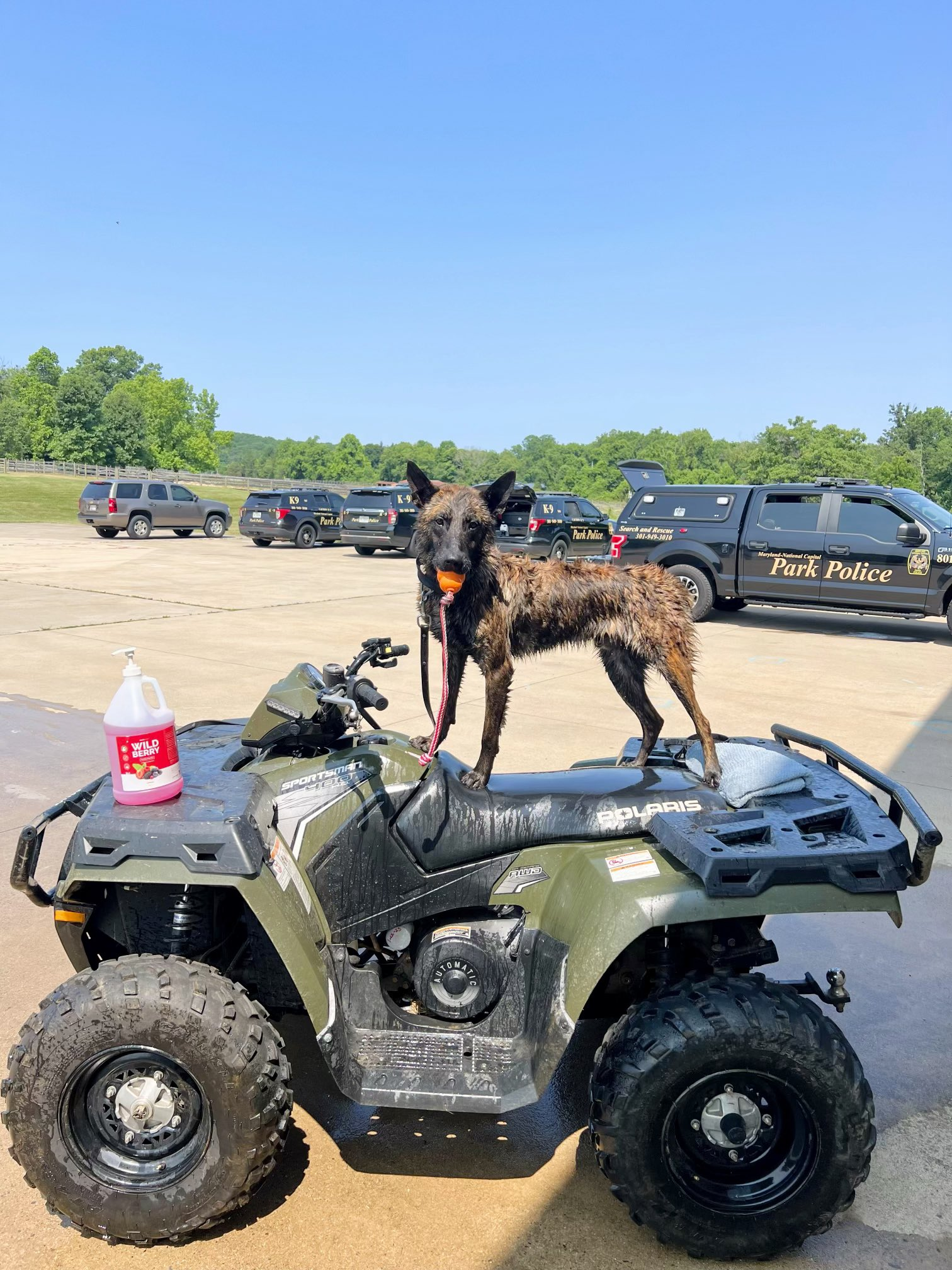
MDPP K-9 and an ATV

The Park Police additionally maintain an extensive K-9 unit consisting of Bloodhounds, German Shepherds, Belgian Malinois, and Labradors. The K-9 unit assists with tracking suspects, searching buildings, open and wooded areas for suspects, searching crime scenes for evidence, apprehending fleeing suspects, narcotic and firearm detection, high-risk arrest and entry situations, search and rescue operations, explosive ordinance detection, and human remains detection.

=== Investigations and task forces ===
The department operates investigative and intelligence functions that conduct follow‑up investigations, plainclothes operations, and criminal intelligence gathering. Detectives investigate crimes occurring on park property and those impacting park users, and coordinate closely with prosecutors and partner agencies. Officers are regularly assigned to multi‑agency task forces, including drug enforcement and gang suppression initiatives, working alongside county, state, and federal agencies such as the Drug Enforcement Administration.

In addition, Park Police officers participate in regional traffic safety and impaired‑driving enforcement units, conducting DUI enforcement campaigns, saturation patrols, and targeted traffic operations in coordination with other law enforcement agencies.

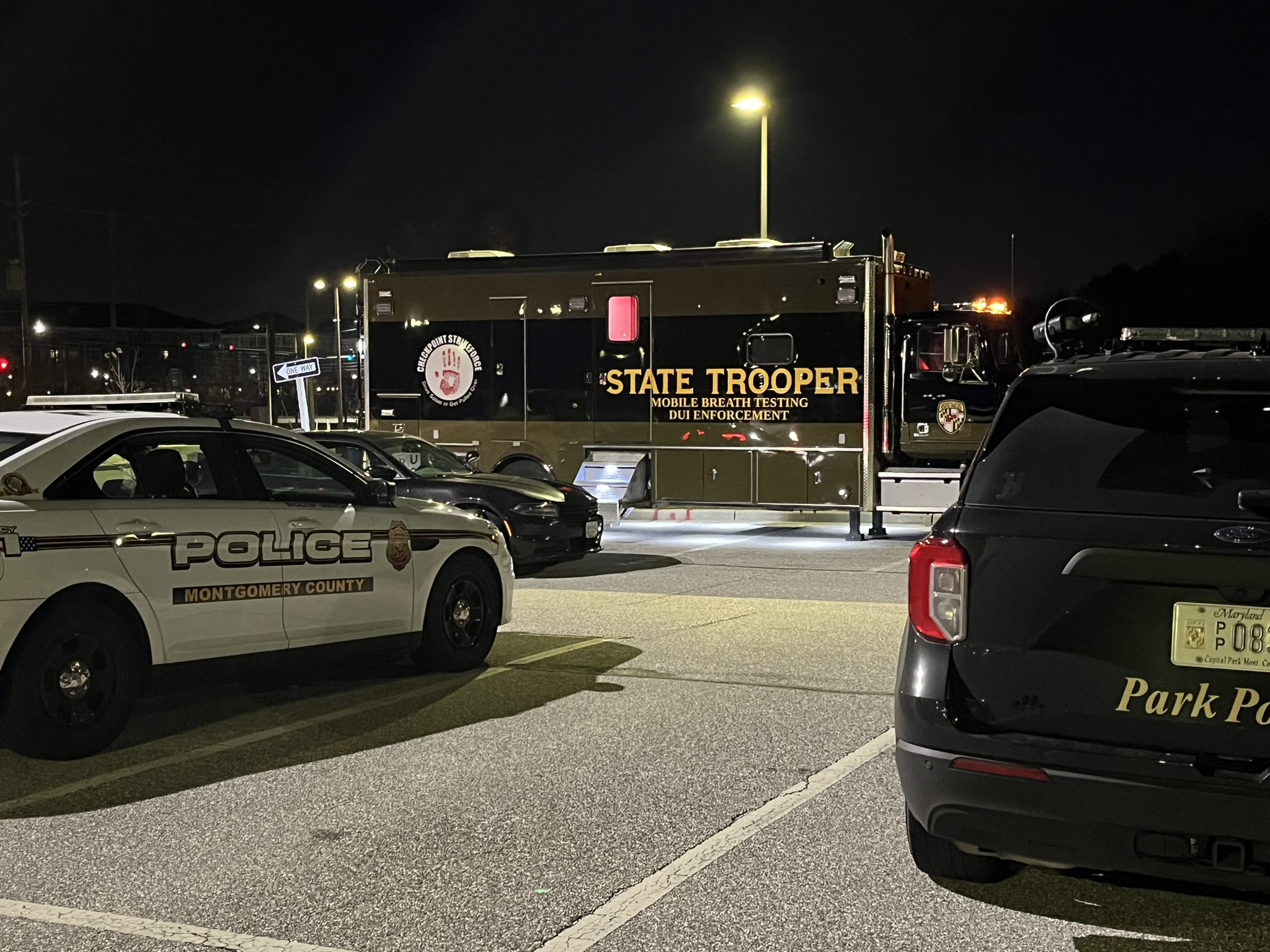
Maryland Park Police assisting on a DUI enforcement detail

=== Major events and regional support ===
The agency also maintains a significant role in major event and regional security operations. Park Police officers are periodically deployed through mutual aid agreements to assist with large‑scale events in the National Capital Region, including presidential inauguration operations in Washington, D.C., where they have provided mounted and ground support alongside federal and regional law enforcement partners.

=== Community engagement ===
Community policing functions are carried out through dedicated outreach and engagement personnel. The department assigns officers to schools through as School Resource Officers, known as Community Engagement Officers in Montgomery County, and provide security presence, mentoring, safety education, and direct engagement with youth and community members.

=== Technology and equipment ===
The Park Police integrates modern policing technology and specialized equipment into its operations. The agency utilizes drones for locating suspects, search and rescue operations, missing person incidents, and situational awareness in large park environments, along with advanced communications and field response capabilities to coordinate incidents across extensive and often remote areas.

== Governance ==
The Commission's ten members include five residents of Montgomery County and five of Prince George's who serve four-year terms. The five members from each county make up the county planning board. In Montgomery County, members are appointed by the County Council and confirmed by the County Executive. In Prince George's County, the County Executive appoints all five members subject to County Council confirmation. Of the members from each county, no more than three may be of the same political party. The appointing authority names the planning board chair. The Commission chair alternates each year between the two planning board chairs. The alternate becomes vice-chair.

The Commission appoints the Executive Director, General Counsel, and Secretary-Treasurer. In Prince George's County, the Parks and Recreation Director and Planning Director are appointed by the County Planning Board. In Montgomery County, the Planning Board appoints a Director of Parks and a Planning Director.
