= Maryland Route 547 =

State highway in Montgomery County, Maryland, US

Maryland Route 547
- Maryland Route 547 highlighted in red

Route information
- Maintained by MDSHA
- Length: 1.80 mi (2.90 km)
- Existed: 1933–present

Major junctions
- West end: MD 355 in North Bethesda
- East end: MD 185 in Kensington

Location
- Country: United States
- State: Maryland
- Counties: Montgomery

Highway system
- Maryland highway system; Interstate; US; State; Scenic Byways
← MD 546	→ MD 550

Maryland Route 547 (MD 547) is a state highway in the U.S. state of Maryland. The highway runs 1.80 miles (2.90 km) from MD 355 in North Bethesda east to MD 185 in Kensington. MD 547 connects North Bethesda and Kensington with Garrett Park in central Montgomery County. The highway was constructed in the early 1930s.

== Route description ==
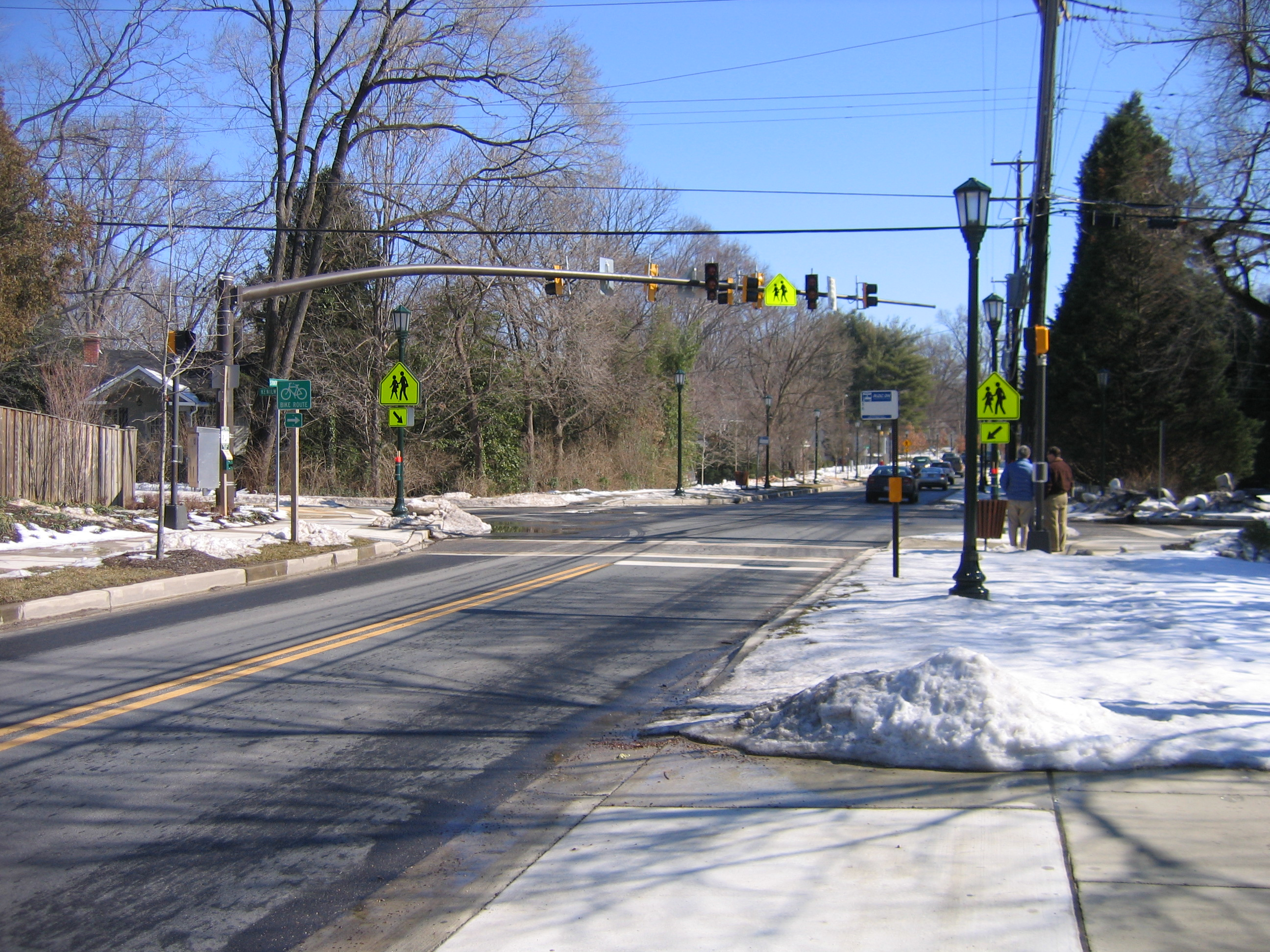
MD 547 eastbound at Kenilworth Avenue in Garrett Park

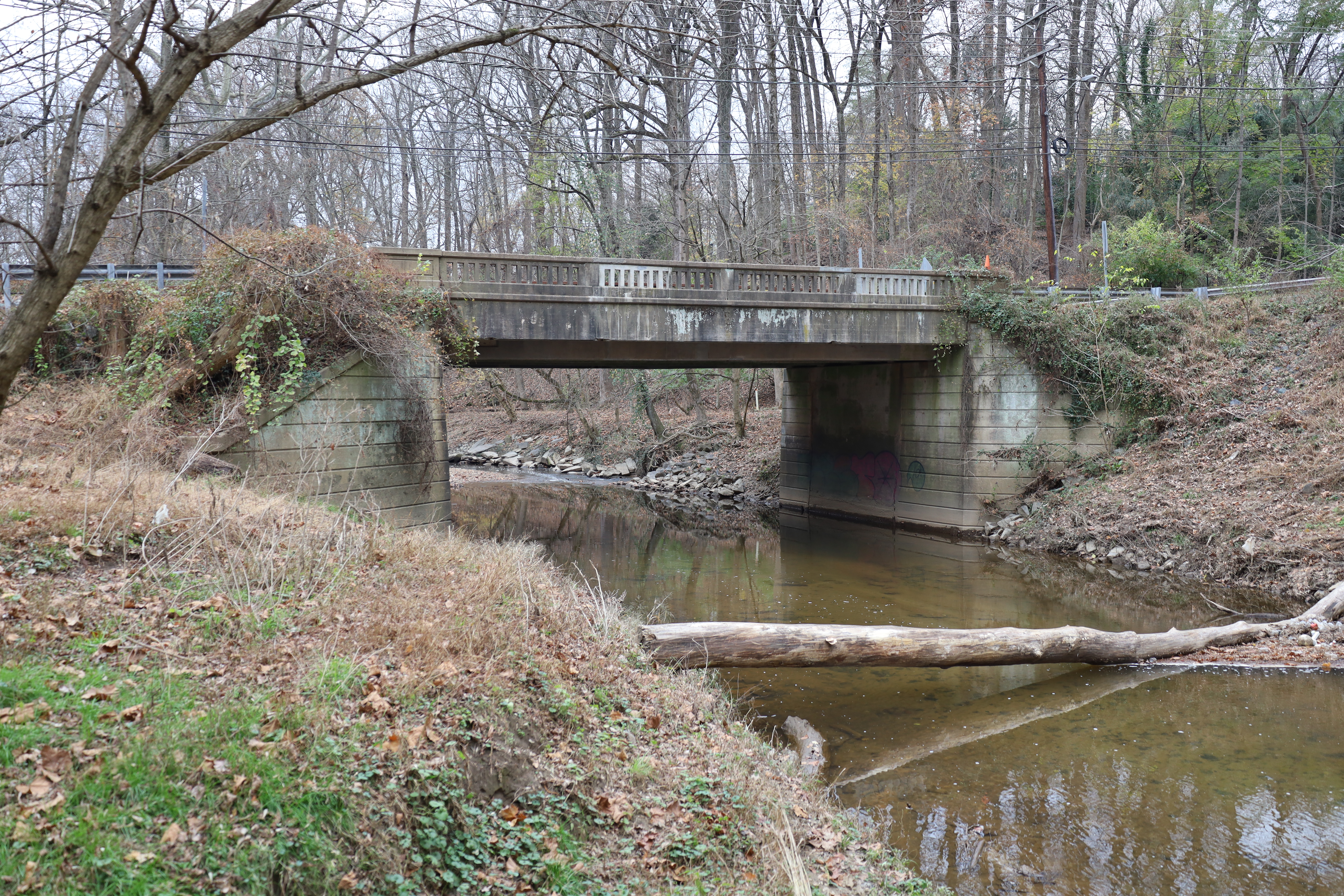
MD 547 crossing Rock Creek

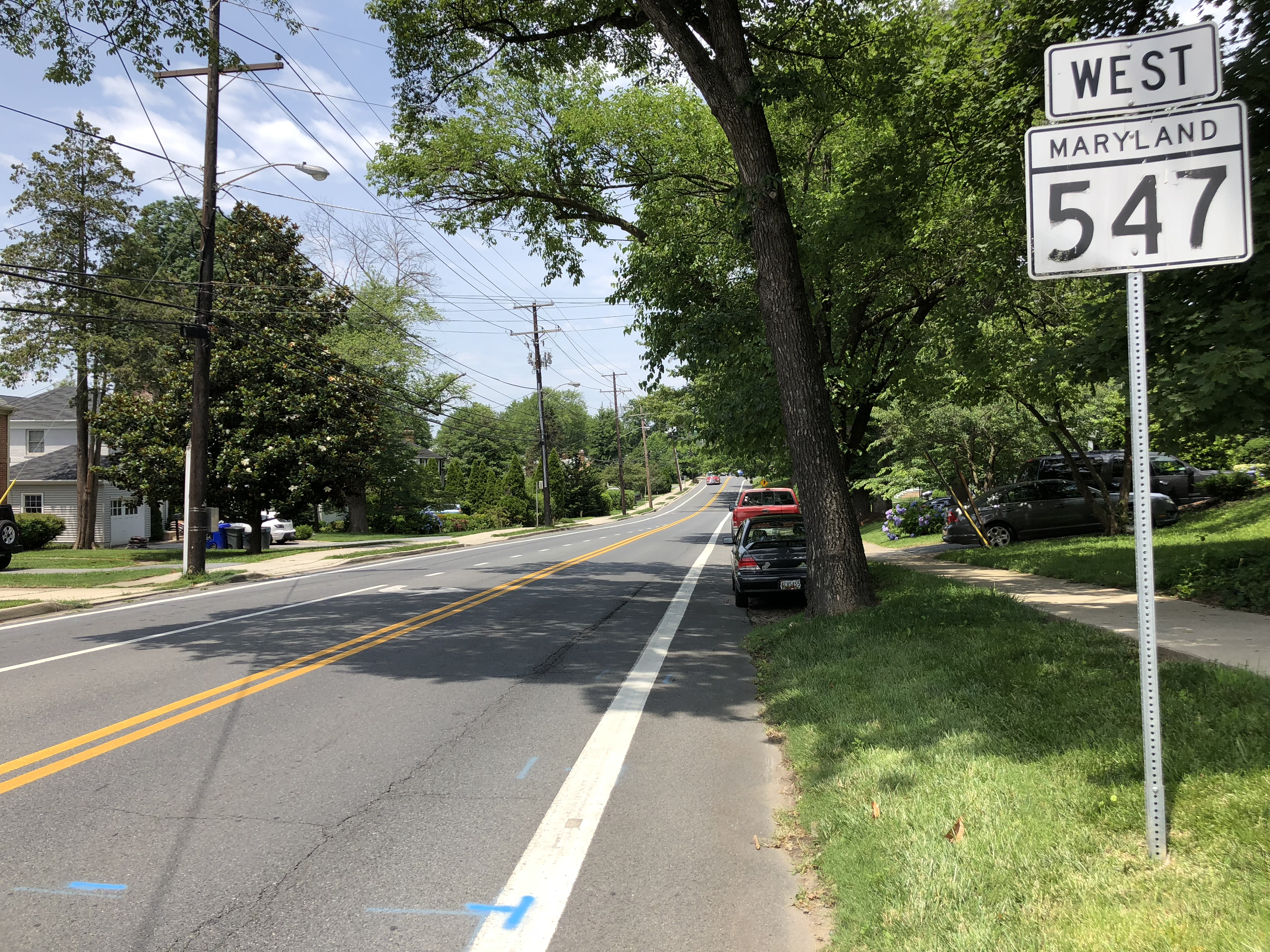
View west along MD 547 at Summit Avenue in Kensington

MD 547 begins as an intersection with MD 355 (Rockville Pike) opposite the entrance to Georgetown Preparatory School in North Bethesda. The state highway heads east as Strathmore Avenue, a two-lane undivided road that passes the grounds of Strathmore, which features a namesake mansion and music center, to the south. After passing the Academy of the Holy Cross, MD 547 enters the town of Garrett Park. The highway passes through the Garrett Park Historic District several blocks to the south of the Garrett Park station on MARC's Brunswick Line. After serving as the town's main street, MD 547 veers southeast and its name changes to Knowles Avenue. The route enters Rock Creek Park, where the highway traverses Rock Creek and intersects Beach Drive. At its junction with Summit Avenue, MD 547 enters the town of Kensington, where it reaches its eastern terminus at MD 185 (Connecticut Avenue). Knowles Avenue continues east for a block before ending at Armory Avenue in the Kensington Historic District.

== History ==
Garrett Park Road was resurfaced with macadam and widened with concrete shoulders from U.S. Route 240 (now MD 355) east to the Kensington town limit at Summit Avenue between 1931 and 1933. MD 547's bridge across Rock Creek was completed in 1932. In 1936, the state highway was extended east two blocks to the new alignment of MD 193 (now MD 185). That highway's present course through Kensington was completed as part of a railroad grade separation project that same year. MD 547 has had only minor changes since the 1930s.

== Junction list ==
The entire route is in Montgomery County.

Location	mi	km	Destinations	Notes
North Bethesda	0.00	0.00	MD 355 (Rockville Pike) – Rockville, Bethesda	Western terminus
Garrett Park	1.22	1.96	Beach Drive – Rock Creek Park	
Kensington	1.80	2.90	MD 185 (Connecticut Avenue) / Knowles Avenue east – Chevy Chase, Wheaton	Eastern terminus
1.000 mi = 1.609 km; 1.000 km = 0.621 mi
