= North Chevy Chase, Maryland =

- Village
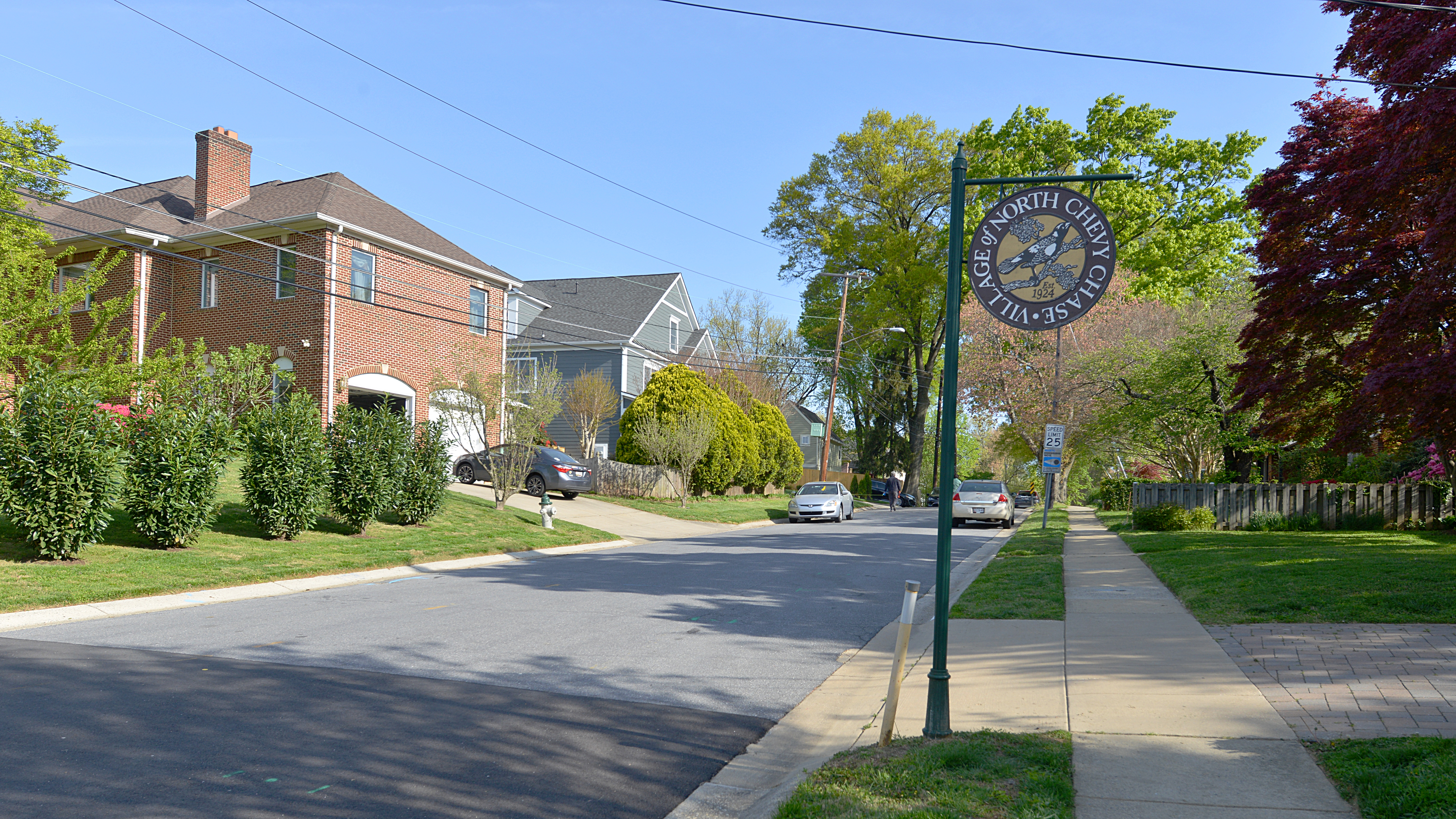

- Seal

- Location in Montgomery County and Maryland
- Coordinates: 39°0′6″N 77°4′26″W
- Country: United States
- State: Maryland
- County: Montgomery
- Special tax district: 1924
- Incorporated: January 12, 1996

Area
  - Total: 0.12 sq mi (0.30 km^{2})
  - Land: 0.12 sq mi (0.30 km^{2})
  - Water: 0 sq mi (0.00 km^{2})
- Elevation: 276 ft (84 m)

Population (2020)
  - Total: 682
  - Density: 5,866.9/sq mi (2,265.22/km^{2})
- Time zone: UTC-5 (Eastern (EST))
  - Summer (DST): UTC-4 (EDT)
- ZIP code: 20815
- Area codes: 240 and 301
- FIPS code: 24-56400
- GNIS feature ID: 0590889
- Website: northchevychase.gov

North Chevy Chase is an incorporated village in Montgomery County, Maryland, United States. It was established as a special tax district in 1924 and incorporated as a village in 1996. The population was 682 at the 2020 census, up from 519 in 2010.

The town is part of a larger community, colloquially referred to as Chevy Chase, that includes several adjoining settlements in Montgomery County and one neighborhood of Washington, D.C.

== History ==
North Chevy Chase lies on the site of Clean Drinking plantation, a much larger colonial land grant visited by George Washington as reported in his diary.

Residential development of the area began in the early 20th century when William H. Walker laid out a community and began selling lots. The area was crossed by the Chevy Chase Lake & Kensington Railway, a two-mile streetcar line built in 1895 to connect the new town of Kensington to the northern terminus of the Rock Creek Railway streetcar line from the District of Columbia.

In 1924, residents incorporated it as a special tax district.

After the streetcar line shut down in 1935, Montgomery County purchased much of the right-of-way, paved it, and opened it in 1940 as Kensington Parkway, the area's main road.

North Chevy Chase was officially incorporated as a village in 1996.

== Geography ==
North Chevy Chase is located in southern Montgomery County at 39°0′6″N 77°4′26″W (39.001709, -77.073908). It is surrounded by unincorporated neighborhoods of Chevy Chase and is less than 3 miles (5 km) north of the District of Columbia.

According to the United States Census Bureau, the village has a total area of 0.12 square miles (0.31 km^{2}), all land.

North Chevy Chase lies immediately south of the Capital Beltway (I-495), just to the east of the interchange with Connecticut Avenue (MD 185). The village is crossed by Kensington Parkway which runs parallel to Connecticut Avenue.

== Demographics ==
Historical population
Census	Pop.	Note	%±
2000	465		—
2010	519		11.6%
2020	682		31.4%
U.S. Decennial Census

=== Racial and ethnic composition ===
North Chevy Chase village, Maryland – Racial and ethnic composition Note: the US Census treats Hispanic/Latino as an ethnic category. This table excludes Latinos from the racial categories and assigns them to a separate category. Hispanics/Latinos may be of any race.
Race / Ethnicity (NH = Non-Hispanic)	Pop 2000	Pop 2010	Pop 2020	% 2000	% 2010	% 2020
White alone (NH)	422	416	497	90.75%	80.15%	72.87%
Black or African American alone (NH)	21	40	38	4.52%	7.71%	5.57%
Native American or Alaska Native alone (NH)	1	0	0	0.22%	0.00%	0.00%
Asian alone (NH)	4	27	52	0.86%	5.20%	7.62%
Native Hawaiian or Pacific Islander alone (NH)	0	0	0	0.00%	0.00%	0.00%
Other race alone (NH)	0	0	3	0.00%	0.00%	0.44%
Mixed race or Multiracial (NH)	8	12	39	1.72%	2.31%	5.72%
Hispanic or Latino (any race)	9	24	53	1.94%	4.62%	7.77%
Total	465	519	682	100.00%	100.00%	100.00%

=== 2010 census ===
As of the census of 2010, there were 519 people, 189 households, and 144 families living in the village. The population density was 4,718.2 inhabitants per square mile (1,821.7/km^{2}). There were 195 housing units at an average density of 1,772.7 per square mile (684.4/km^{2}). The racial makeup of the village was 83.8% White, 7.7% African American, 5.4% Asian, 0.8% from other races, and 2.3% from two or more races. Hispanic or Latino of any race were 4.6% of the population.

There were 189 households, of which 37.0% had children under the age of 18 living with them, 69.3% were married couples living together, 5.8% had a female householder with no husband present, 1.1% had a male householder with no wife present, and 23.8% were non-families. 18.5% of all households were made up of individuals, and 9.6% had someone living alone who was 65 years of age or older. The average household size was 2.75 and the average family size was 3.17.

The median age in the village was 45.2 years. 27% of residents were under the age of 18; 5.7% were between the ages of 18 and 24; 17% were from 25 to 44; 35.9% were from 45 to 64; and 14.5% were 65 years of age or older. The gender makeup of the village was 46.1% male and 53.9% female.

=== 2000 census ===
As of the census of 2000, there were 465 people, 173 households, and 126 families living in the village. The population density was 4,094.5 inhabitants per square mile (1,580.9/km^{2}). There were 176 housing units at an average density of 1,549.7 per square mile (598.3/km^{2}). The racial makeup of the village was 92.47% White, 4.52% African American, 0.22% Native American, 0.86% Asian, 0.22% from other races, and 1.72% from two or more races. Hispanic or Latino of any race were 1.94% of the population.

There were 173 households, out of which 37.0% had children under the age of 18 living with them, 59.0% were married couples living together, 11.0% had a female householder with no husband present, and 26.6% were non-families. 20.8% of all households were made up of individuals, and 9.8% had someone living alone who was 65 years of age or older. The average household size was 2.69 and the average family size was 3.11.

In the village, the population was spread out, with 27.1% under the age of 18, 3.9% from 18 to 24, 24.3% from 25 to 44, 28.2% from 45 to 64, and 16.6% who were 65 years of age or older. The median age was 42 years. For every 100 females, there were 90.6 males. For every 100 females age 18 and over, there were 90.4 males.

The median income for a household in the village was $103,196, and the median income for a family was $106,942. Males had a median income of $72,292 versus $39,583 for females. The per capita income for the village was $43,499. About 1.7% of families and 2.3% of the population were below the poverty line, including 1.5% of those under age 18 and none of those age 65 or over.

== Education ==
North Chevy Chase is a part of the Montgomery County Public Schools. Zoned schools include Rosemary Hills Elementary School (PreK-2), North Chevy Chase Elementary School (3-6), Westland Middle School, (6-8) and Bethesda-Chevy Chase High School.

North Chevy Chase Elementary School is a magnet elementary school. It opened in 1953 as a community school. After closing in the early 1970s the school reopened in 1972, after the formation of Rosemary Hills Primary School, to serve as a magnet for grades 3–6.

== Transportation ==
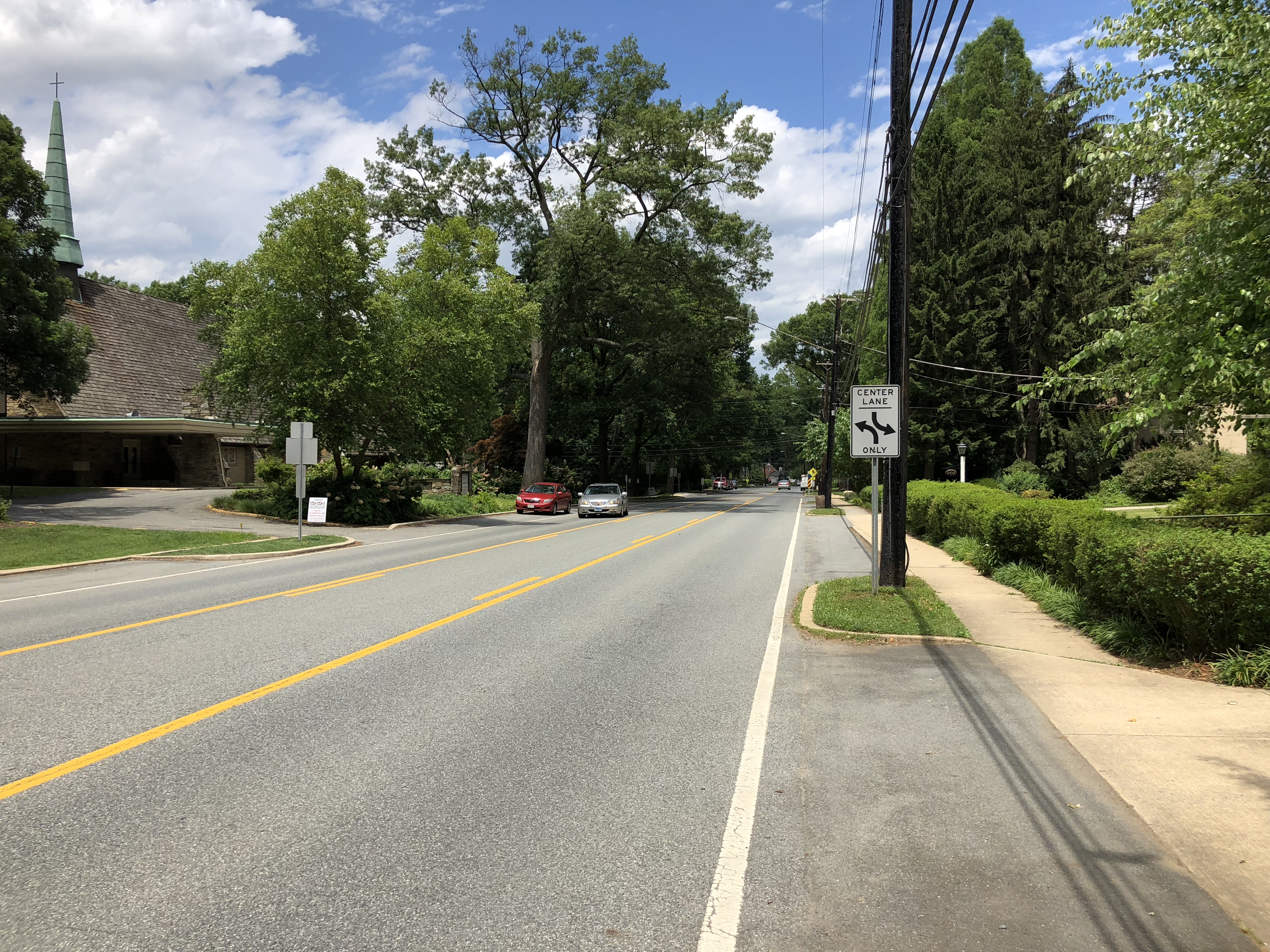
Kensington Parkway northbound in North Chevy Chase

No state highways directly serve North Chevy Chase. The most significant road serving the town is Kensington Parkway. However, just outside the town limits, Maryland Route 185 (Connecticut Avenue) has an interchange with Interstate 495 (the Capital Beltway), providing easy road access to much of the region.

== Government ==
The village is governed by a citizens committee of five members, including a chairman.
