= Chevy Chase Lake & Kensington Railway =

Defunct streetcar line in Montgomery County, Maryland

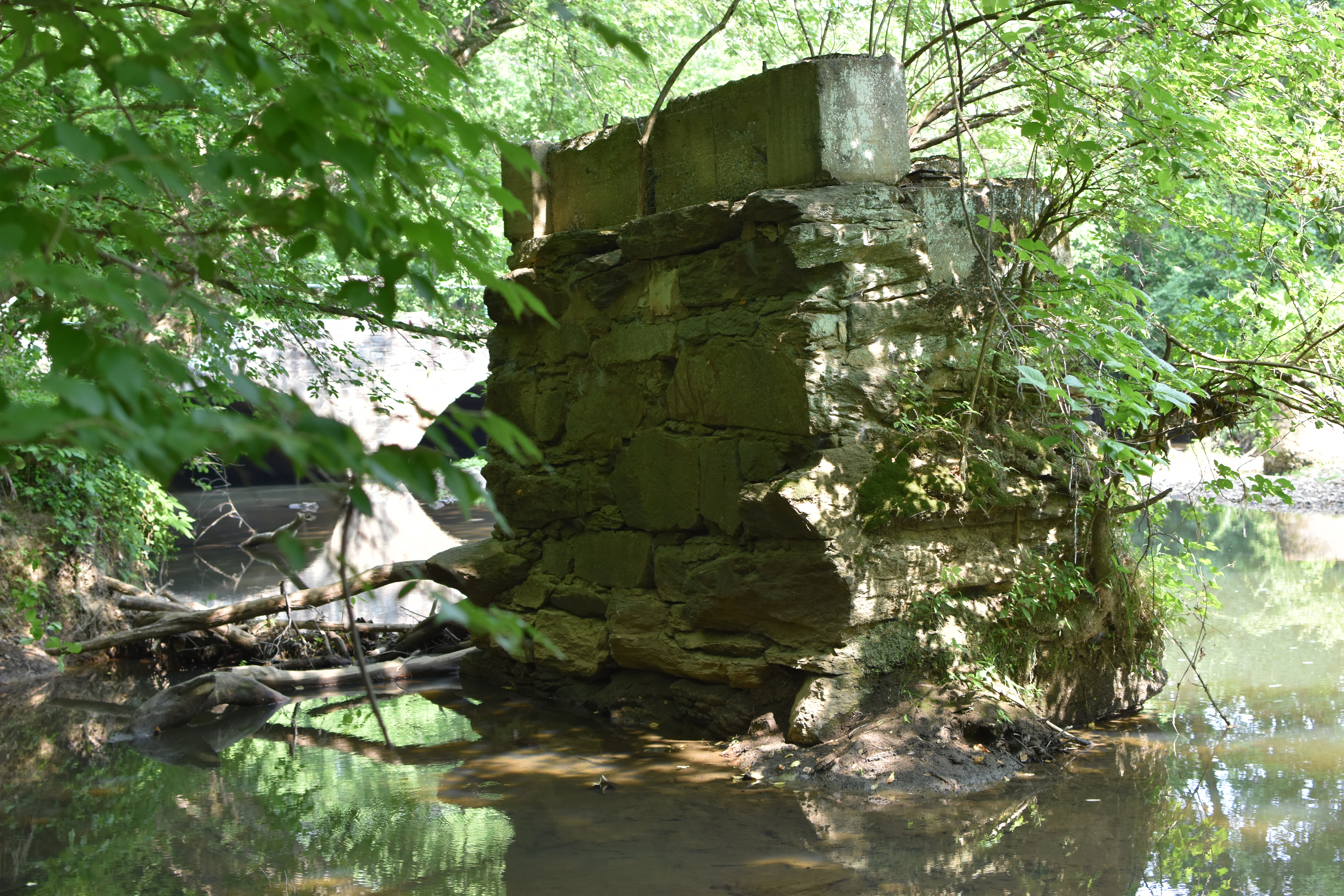
- Surviving abutment of bridge over Rock Creek (2023)

Overview
- Other name: Kensington Railway
- Status: defunct
- Termini: Kensington, Maryland; Chevy Chase Lake

Service
- Type: Streetcar

The Chevy Chase Lake & Kensington Railway (later, the Kensington Railway Company) was a streetcar company that operated in southern Montgomery County, Maryland, from 1895 to 1935. It connected the town of Kensington to the northern terminus of the Rock Creek Railway (later, the Capital Traction Company) at Chevy Chase Lake. At its peak, it operated on about 3.75 miles of track, including the associated Sandy Spring Railway.

== History ==
=== CCL&K Railway (1894–1901) ===
The Chevy Chase Lake & Kensington Railway was chartered in September 1894 by Kensington founder Brainard Warner and others to connect the newly incorporated town to downtown Washington, D.C., some eight miles south, via the Rock Creek Railway streetcar line.

Its northern terminus sat just south of the Kensington railroad station, built in 1891 by the Baltimore & Ohio Railroad. It was also near a bank and "opposite Hopkins' store". The line wound southward along the Rock Creek tributary of Silver Creek, then through the neighborhood of Kenilworth (today called North Chevy Chase). The southern terminus was just southwest of the grade crossing of the B&O's Georgetown Branch over Connecticut Avenue at the Chevy Chase Lake amusement park (near today's 8400 Connecticut Avenue). The line was noted for its many curves laid to reduce grades, the company having decided that extra track was better than cuts and fills. A 200-foot through siding, dubbed Ray's Turnout after the former owner of the farm it sat on, was laid north of the Rock Creek bridge to allow streetcars to pass each other on the single-track line. There was also a stub-end siding at the southern terminus. Like most electric streetcars, it drew its power from overhead wires strung on posts.

Operations began on May 30, 1895, with two closed motor cars, Nos. 1 & 2, built by Jackson and Sharp Co. (A builder's photo shows No. 2 lettered "Chevy Chase, Kenilworth & Kensington".) Electrical power was purchased from the Rock Creek Railway's coal-fired generating station at Chevy Chase Lake. The RCR, which would within months be merged to create the Capital Traction Company, also handled the line's maintenance.

In 1899, the owners received a judge's permission to extend the line from Chevy Chase Lake eastward to Bethesda, where it was to connect with the Capital Traction line to the Tenleytown neighborhood of Washington, D.C. Through service from Tenleytown to Kensington was envisioned, as Capital Traction had bought an option to open the new service, as was another extension to Garrett Park. Jubilant, the owners announced plans to rename their line Kensington Electric Railway, Light, and Power Company. But none of these plans would bear fruit. When company officers met for its annual meeting in July 1900, they did so under the original name of CCL&KRy.

By 1901, the line was carrying 400 to 800 passengers a day, generating annual revenues of about $5,000 ($189,000 today). But it was paying $1,400 for power to Capital Traction, and losing ridership to the B&O railroad, which carried increasing numbers of commuters on its Metropolitan Branch between Kensington and downtown Washington, D.C. The company found itself unable to repay its bank loans and unable to persuade its shareholders to supply more capital. In November 1901, the line was foreclosed upon and put up for auction.

=== Kensington Railway (1902–1923) ===
The Chevy Chase Lake & Kensington Railway attracted no bidders for months, but was purchased at last in July 1902 by George E. Emmons of Washington, D.C. Emmons turned out to be acting on behalf of several of the officers of the CCL&K, and on August 14, 1902, they incorporated the Kensington Railway Company to try their hands again, announcing new plans to extend the line to Garrett Park and to Wheaton.

A year later, the Kensington line was operating 2.53 miles of track, according to a Baltimore Sun survey of the state's electric railways,

In 1906, controlling interest in the Kensington streetcar line was purchased by R. Henry Phillips of Washington for $8,000. He ran the line himself, with the help of one employee, offering half-hourly service between the termini.

But Phillips had bought the line with plans to expand it, at least some 8.5 miles north to Sandy Spring. To do so, he bought the failed Sandy Spring Railway, which had been founded in 1902 but had made almost no progress on its goal to connect Kensington to Ellicott City, some 28 miles northwest and home to the original terminus of the B&O Railroad.

It took two years for Phillips to open operations on the Sandy Spring's tracks, which began on July 1, 1908. Over the next eight years, Phillips slowly extended the Sandy Spring line. The first extension ran from Kensington's B&O station through town westward along the B&O tracks almost to the road bridge that carried the Bethesda-Bladensburg road over the tracks. There the Sandy Spring built a steel bridge north across the tracks, which opened on February 22, 1915. Another extension, to Kensington's Norris Station (near today's 3535 University Boulevard), opened on April 8, 1916, bringing the Sandy Spring to its total and final length to 1.25 miles of track.

The line operated from 6:30 a.m. until midnight, with cars leaving the Chevy Chase Lake station on the hour and half-hour, and the Kensington station at 15 and 45 minutes past the hour. A one-way ticket in 1911 cost 5 cents, or 50 for $1.50.

Wrote the Montgomery County Historical Society:

During the early years of its operation, this trolly line was a purely local institution, with the same customers, and a real family spirit between passengers and operator. The 7:45 morning car carried not only commuters going to work, but also most of the high school age youngsters, since there were no high schools near Kensington. The motorman always stopped at Kent Street and at Washington Street whether or not a passenger was waiting, as he knew the street would be lined with customers running for the car...

The car took fifteen minutes for the trip, over a winding, unballasted track. Most of the time there was a one-man crew, and fares were collected between the town limit and the Rock Creek trestle, with the power cut to half speed, and the car moving at not over five miles per hour. This practice, while considered normal by regular passengers, frequently alarmed strangers...

The owner-operator frequently carried a shotgun on the front platform and would stop to take a shot at a hawk. On a summer night, when the oil headlight showed a possum on the track, all hands piled out for a chase, and the captured possum was placed in the sand box.

Other local historians wrote in 1953:

Many of the residents of North Chevy Chase remember the two accommodating motormen; Bob Sheppard and Ed Kelly, who ran the cars. They rendered invaluable service to the community, by stopping anywhere along the lines to take on or discharge passengers. They would obligingly hold over the last car at the Lake for a half hour or more to accommodate a late theater goer. Also, housewives remember them kindly for their free delivery service. At that time, it was only necessary to telephone the groceryman at Kensington for five gallons of kerosene, or other needed supplies and on the return trips announced by the clanging of the foot bell, the waiting resident received the orders which had been placed post haste on the front platform of the trolley by the storekeeper. Many an unexpected guest, in the evening, was treated to McKeever's ice cream from the store in Kensington by the same service.

=== Lease to Capital Traction (1923–1935) ===
But by the early 1920s, passengers were complaining of aged—even unsanitary—streetcars and spotty service. Despite a 1920 ticket-price hike (one-way from the southern terminus rose to 7 cents to North Chevy Chase and 8 cents to the junction with the Sandy Spring Railroad in Kensington), the Kensington and Sandy Spring lines reported three straight years of losses around $3,500 on revenues of roughly $13,000 ($244,000 today).

In May 1922, Maryland's Public Service Commission, which regulates the state's streetcars, helped shepherd a tentative deal between local residents, Capital Traction executives, and the owners of the Kensington and Sandy Spring railroads. Under the agreement, Capital Traction—by then, the second-largest streetcar operator in the Washington, D.C., region—would connect the Kensington lines to its own network at Chevy Chase Lake, then run its own streetcars from Kensington all the way down Connecticut Avenue to downtown Washington. In return, local residents would raise enough money to replace the Kensington line's light rails with heavier ones suitable for Capital Transit's larger streetcars. This the residents did, raising $13,500 by June.

But in July, Phillips balked at signing the agreement, insisting it be amended to allow him to close the railroad and keep the money if the company could not make his bank payments after six months. In response, Kensington residents delivered a petition asking the Public Service Commission to summon Phillips to explain service that had become a "miserable travesty" and streetcars so old, they said, as to be unsafe and unsanitary. They also asked the commission to force Phillips to sign the agreement as is.

Negotiations continued. In April 1923, the Public Service Commission rejected Phillips' proposal to sell the railroads to Capital Traction outright. But the following month, the commission approved a plan to lease the lines to Capital Traction for 10 years, with profits on the lines split between the larger company and the smaller ones. That lease took effect on August 1, 1923, and soon Kensington residents could travel from their neighborhood to downtown D.C. without switching rides or paying two fares.

The old CCL&K streetcar made its last run on November 10, 1923, and was subsequently parked on the stub at Chevy Chase Lake. Service was henceforth offered on the larger, newer Capital Transit trolleys. Lost in the transition was the motorman's practice of stopping wherever a rider hailed along the line, or waiting while a passenger ran a small errand; the new trolleys made only designated stops and kept a strict schedule.

By the time the lease ended in 1933, Capital Traction was ailing, hurt by the Great Depression and competition from automobiles and buses. Phillips announced on August 1 that he intended to resume operating the Kensington Railway the following day, but it appears that Capital Traction retained operating rights. In December, Capital Traction merged with the region's other large streetcar operator, the Washington Railway and Electric Company. But the resulting Capital Transit Company remained weak, and in 1935, it asked the Public Service Commission for permission to abandon its streetcar operations up Connecticut Avenue to Kensington.

On September 15, 1935, the company began running buses in place of trolleys. "It was the most significant District streetcar abandonment up to that time", the Washington Post would write.

== Legacy ==
Within three years of the line's abandonment, plans were made to pave the railroad's winding right-of-way and turn it into a road. On November 9, 1937, the trustees of the Kensington Railway Company sold the railroad's assets, including the 25-foot-wide right-of-way from Kensington to Chevy Chase Lake, at a public auction outside the town post office. In July 1938, the Kensington town council began negotiations to acquire the right-of-way and adjacent land. The road, Kensington Parkway, opened on December 7, 1940.

Montgomery County would later convert some 14 acres of the land along Silver Creek, the stream that largely dictated the streetcar right-of-way, into Kensington Parkway Stream Valley Park.

Two stone abutments of the bridge over Rock Creek survive.

== See also ==
- Streetcars in Washington, D.C., and Maryland
