= Kensington station (Maryland) =

MARC rail station in Kensington, Maryland, United States

Kensington
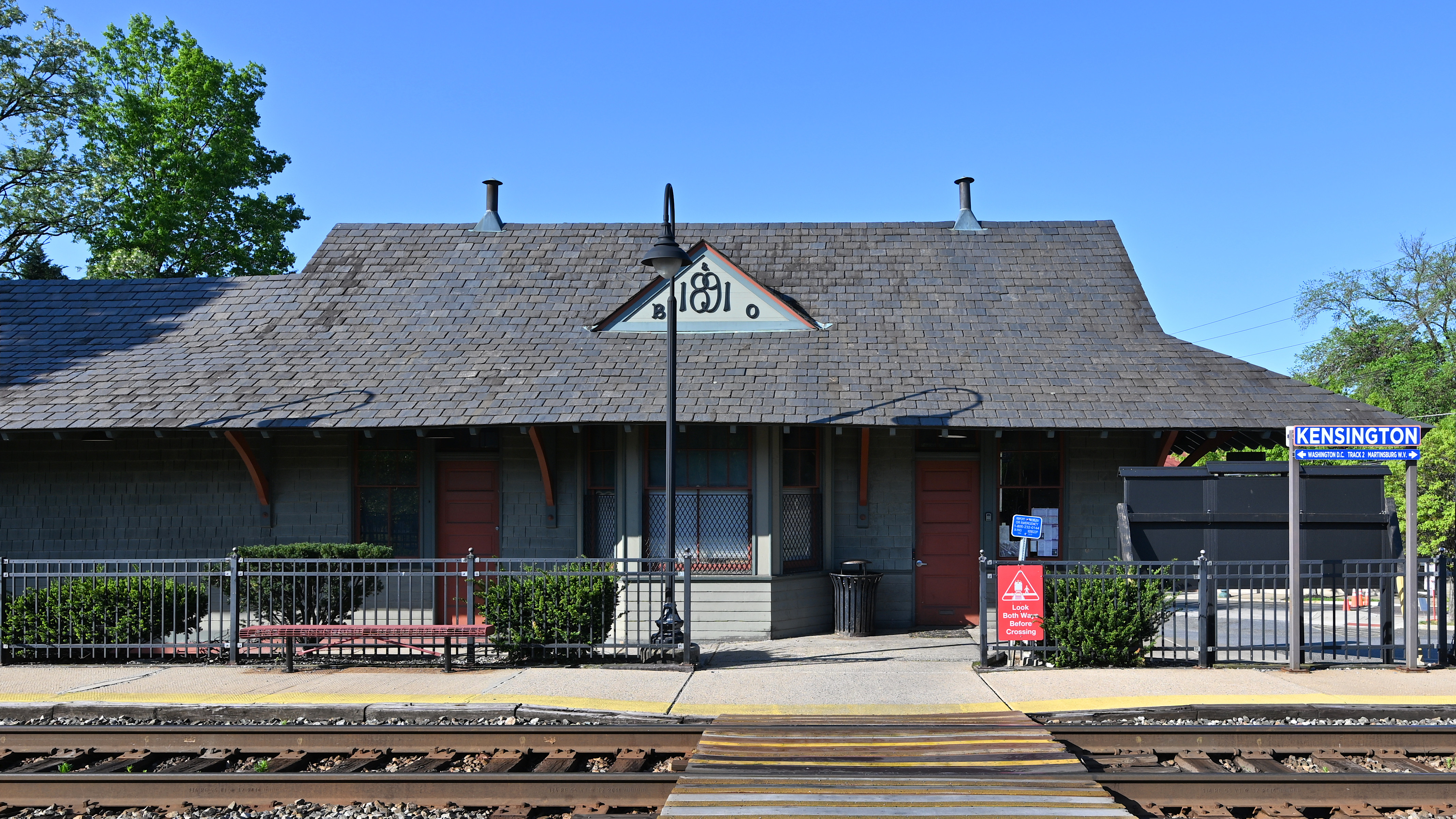

General information
- Location: 3701 Howard Avenue; Kensington, Maryland
- Owner: MARC
- Line: Metropolitan Subdivision
- Platforms: 2 side platforms
- Tracks: 2
- Connections: Ride On

Construction
- Parking: Yes, 48 free spaces
- Cycle facilities: No
- Accessible: No

History
- Opened: 1891 (B&O)

Passengers
- November 2022: 60 (daily) (MARC)

Services
Preceding station	MARC	Following station
Garrett Park toward Martinsburg or Frederick	Brunswick Line	Silver Spring toward Union Station
Rockville toward Brunswick	Brunswick Line limited service	Silver Spring toward Camden Station
Former services
Preceding station	Baltimore and Ohio Railroad	Following station
Garrett Park toward Chicago	Main Line	Woodside toward Jersey City
Garrett Park toward Chicago	Main Line	Capitol View toward Jersey City
- Kensington Railroad Station
- U.S. Historic district – Contributing property
- Location: Kensington, Maryland, USA
- Coordinates: 39°1′36.4″N 77°4′18.5″W
- Architect: Ephraim Francis Baldwin
- Architectural style: Late Victorian
- Part of: Kensington Historic District (ID80001827)
- Added to NRHP: September 14, 1980
Location

Kensington station is a passenger railroad station at 10417 Howard Avenue in Kensington, Maryland, United States. Opened by the Baltimore and Ohio Railroad (B&O) in 1891, the Kensington station is today served by MARC Train's Brunswick Line, which makes 15 weekday scheduled stops at Kensington, plus one flag stop on Fridays.

== Station layout ==
Kensington station has a former B&O station master's house. The building is open during the Kensington Farmers Market, which is held in the station parking lot. Inside there is an old stove, waiting area, and restrooms. Tickets can be purchased from a self-service machine. During the Kensington Labor Day Parade, CSX Transportation, which currently owns the railroad line, offers free souvenirs. There is also a small model train layout. The platform is a low-level concrete platform. On the other side, there is a covered waiting area and some benches. Elaborate safety measures can be found on the crosswalk between the platforms leading to the station entrance that include crossbuck signs with warning bells, highway signs, and pedestrian signals. The station is not compliant with the Americans with Disabilities Act of 1990, lacking raised platforms for level boarding.

== History ==
The B&O completed construction of the Metropolitan Branch through Montgomery County in 1873. The line connected Washington, D.C., to Cumberland, Maryland and points west.

Initially, the settlement around the railroad line was known as Knowles Station. The town was incorporated in 1894 and was named Kensington at that time. The B&O station was designed by architect Ephraim Francis Baldwin and opened in 1891. From 1893 to 1935, the station was used as a terminal for the Kensington Electric Railway, which offered streetcar service to Chevy Chase, Maryland. The station is a contributing property to the Kensington Historic District.

== Gallery ==
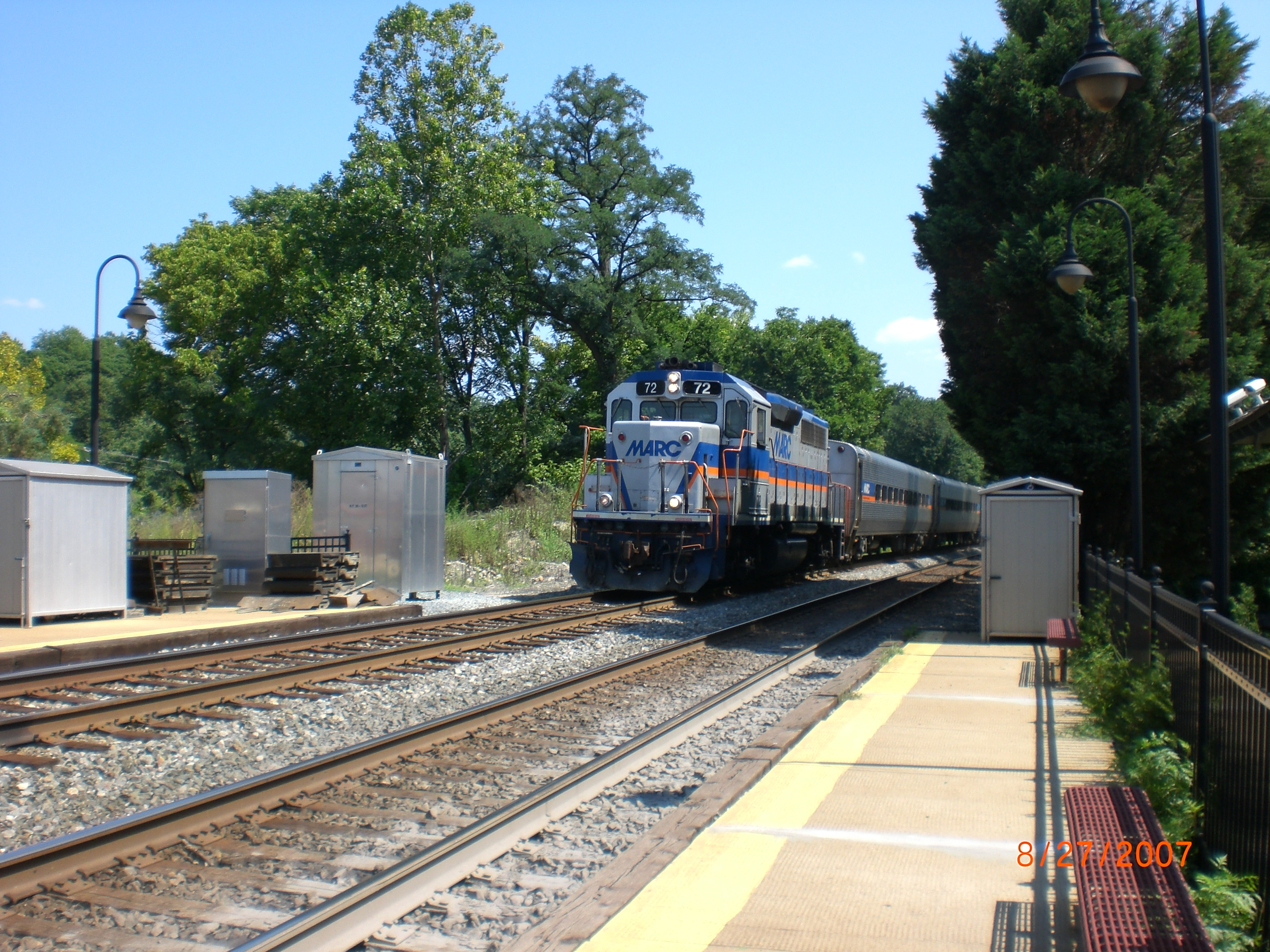
MARC Locomotive #72 arrives at Kensington station

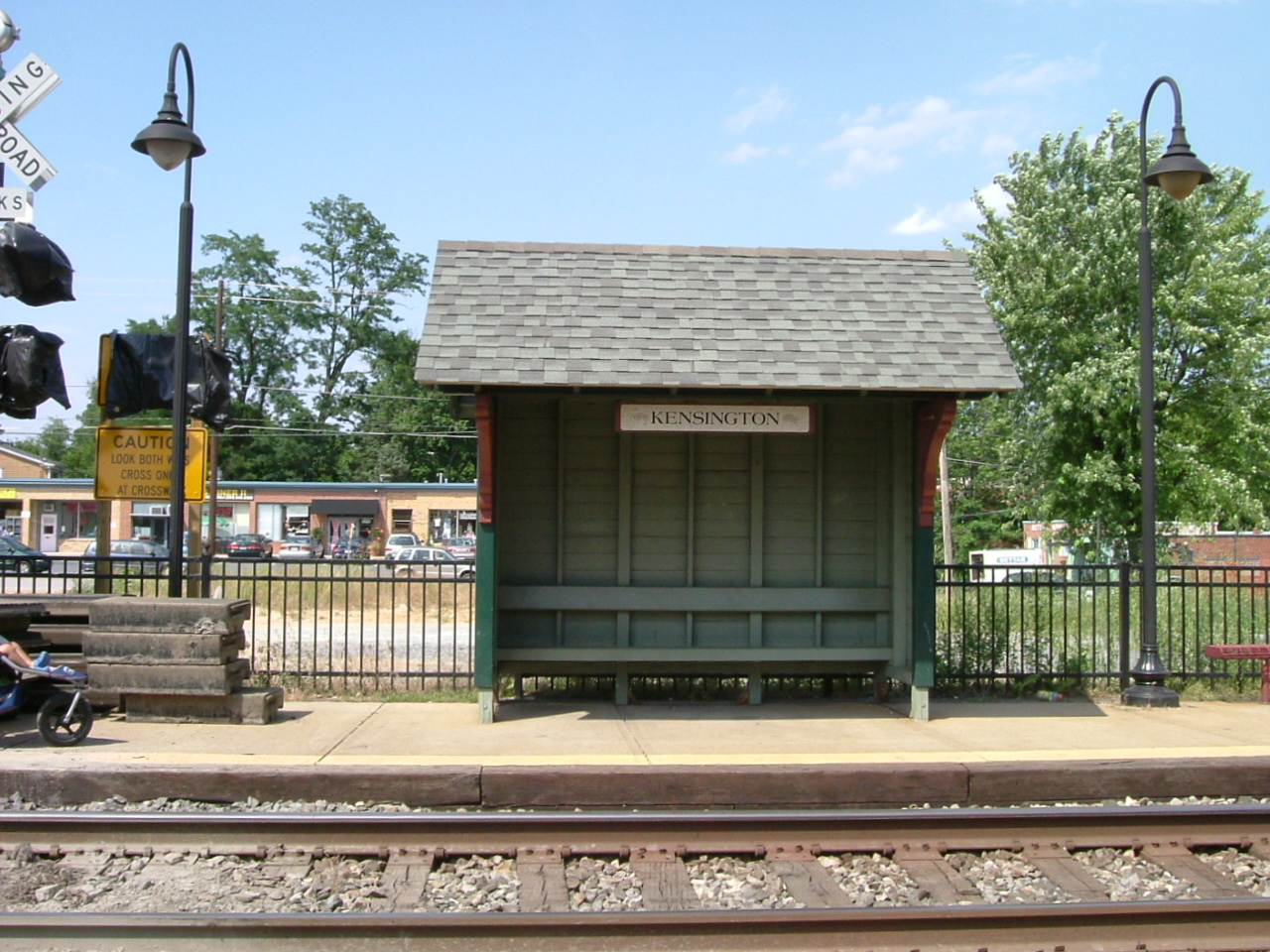
Kensington station shelter

== See also ==
- Metropolitan Subdivision
- Washington D.C. Streetcars (Maryland)
