= Temple Emanuel (Kensington, Maryland) =

Reform synagogue in Kensington, Maryland, US

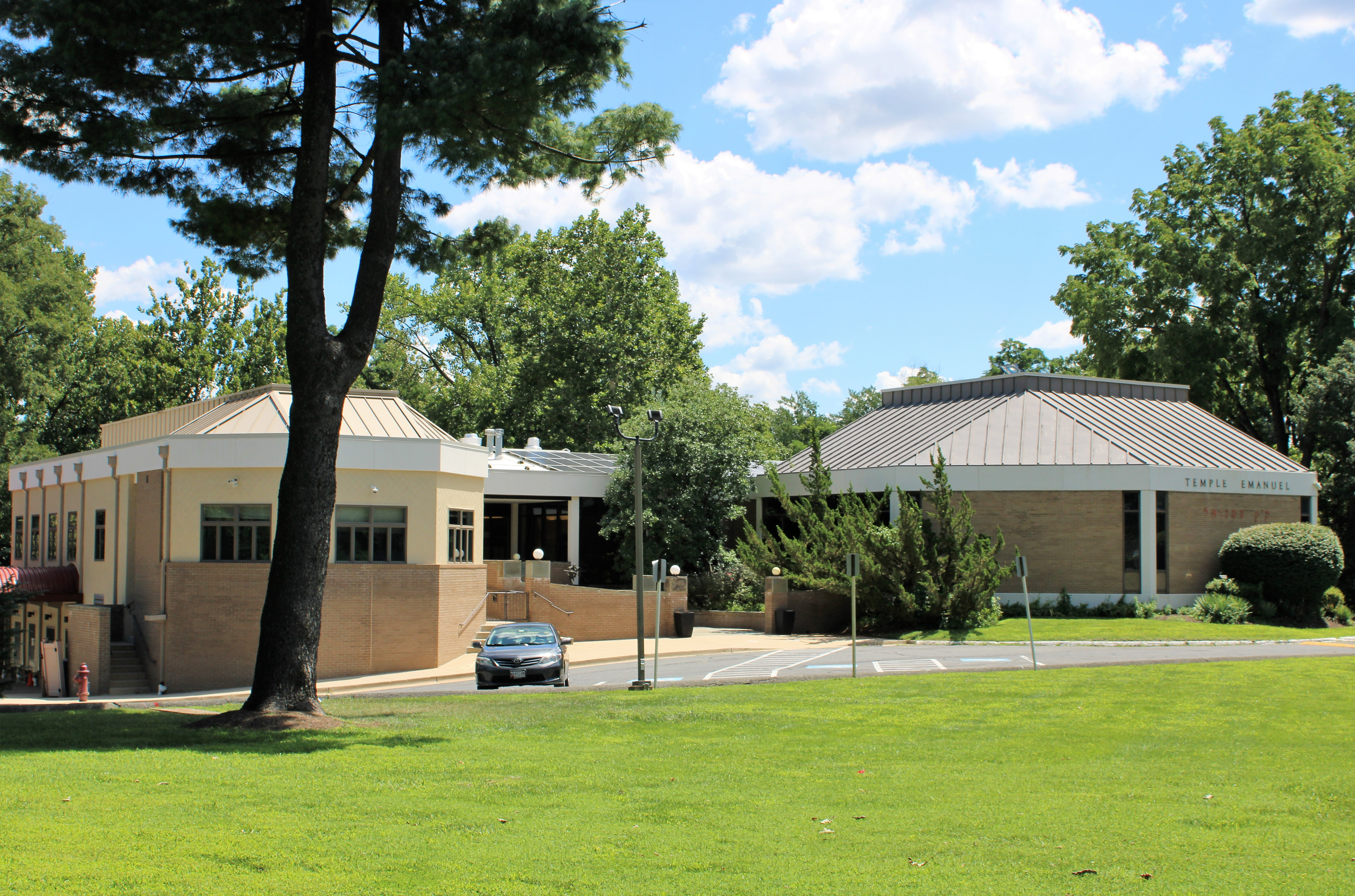

- Location in Maryland

Religion
- Affiliation: Reform Judaism
- Ecclesiastical or organisational status: Synagogue
- Leadership: Rabbi Adam Rosenwasser
- Status: Active

Location
- Location: Connecticut Avenue, Kensington, Maryland
- Country: United States
- Coordinates: 39°01′16″N 77°04′33″W

Architecture
- Type: Synagogue
- Established: 1952 (as a congregation)
- Completed: 1958

Specifications
- Interior area: 13,180 square feet (1,224 m^{2})
- Site area: 5 acres (2.0 ha)

Website
- templeemanuelmd.org

Temple Emanuel is a Reform Jewish congregation and synagogue located in Kensington, Maryland, in the United States.

== History ==
Temple Emanuel was incorporated on December 2, 1952, and at the time it was the only Reform congregation in Montgomery County. Rabbi Leon M. Adler served as its first spiritual leader. In January 1955, the congregation purchased five acres (2.0 ha) on Connecticut Avenue in Kensington, to build a sanctuary, religious school, and social hall. Construction of the building was completed in 1958 and the synagogue was formally dedicated on May 2, 1958.

=== Torah ===
In 1998 Temple Emanuel purchased an historic Torah, initially owned by a Jewish congregation in Slonim, Russia. In 1917, the Slonim congregation buried two Torahs in wooden chests in a field to protect them from the Bolsheviks, who had been closing synagogues and burning Torahs throughout the Soviet Union. The Torahs remained there when, on June 25, 1941, Nazi soldiers marched Slonim's Jewish residents to the same field and murdered them there. The descendants of Slonim's rabbi returned to Slonim and retrieved the two buried Torahs in the 1990s.

== Clergy ==
Logo of Temple Emanuel

On February 27, 1988, Rabbi Adler died of an aneurysm. Rabbi Warren G. Stone was installed as Temple Emanuel's spiritual leader on November 15, 1988. Originally from Massachusetts, Rabbi Stone had served as rabbi of Stephen S Wise Temple in Los Angeles and Temple Beth El in Corpus Christi, Texas, for six years. In recent years, Rabbi Stone retired. Rabbi Adam Rosenwasser was installed as Senior Rabbi on July 1, 2020.

== Religious programs and activities ==
Temple Emanuel Shabbat services and Jewish holiday services.

Temple Emanuel holds brit milah and baby naming ceremonies for newborns, b'nai mitzvah ceremonies for students, marriage ceremonies and blessings, and funeral services.

Temple Emanuel operates an after-school program with a religious curriculum. Temple Emanuel's Early Childhood Center (TEECC) for children ages two to five opened in fall 2008. There are also youth groups for children and teenagers.

As part of its adult learning program, Temple Emanuel has workshops and classes about spiritualism and Judaism. Discussion topics have included Black-Jewish relations, Israeli literature, coping with the rise of antisemitism in 21st-century Europe; Martin Luther King Jr. and social justice; the lack of access to affordable medical care and Jewish teachings related to the issue; Jewish mysticism and Kabbalah; and a Jewish perspective on equal rights for gays and lesbians.

Temple Emanuel hosted an ecumenical Seder dinner for Jewish and non-Jewish people at Temple Emanuel. Cosponsored by the Friedrich Naumann Foundation and the Friedrich Ebert Foundation, clergy of different religious denominations read poems about Passover in Hebrew, Yiddish, Aramaic, and English.

== Performing arts ==
Temple Emanuel has hosted musical performances such as Russian, Georgian, and Romani songs by musicians of the former Soviet Union; chamber music composed by victims of the Holocaust; and klezmer music inspired by the life and work of the founder of Hasidic Judaism, Baal Shem Tov.

In February 2000, Temple Emanuel's Shabbat service included a dance interpretation of the week's Torah portion, performed by Avodah Dance Ensemble. In December 2003, Temple Emanuel's Shabbat service included jazz music.

== Charitable activities ==
In 1995, forty members of Temple Emanuel cooked and served turkeys to people who were homeless as part of an ecumenical Christmas dinner with So Others Might Eat.

In October 2007, members of Temple Emanuel collected and donated 5,742 pounds (2,605 kg) of groceries to local food banks.

== Activism ==
=== Vietnam War ===
In 1971, Temple Emanuel resolved that President Richard Nixon "set and announce a complete withdrawal of all American forces operating in and over Vietnam, Laos and Cambodia by March 1972". The resolution urged Congress to act to end the war if the president did not do so.

=== Natan Sharansky ===
In March 1977, the Soviet Union arrested Natan Sharansky for being a spy for the Central Intelligence Agency. The Soviet Union accused Sharansky of giving the Central Intelligence Agency lists of over 1,300 refuseniks, many of whom were denied exit visas because of their knowledge of state secrets. Representatives of Temple Emanuel met with the head of the Department of State's Human Rights Office to urged the Department of State to pressure the Soviet Union to release Sharansky.

=== Sustainability ===
Temple Emanuel has a zero-carbon footprint by supporting the alternative energy investments. Temple Emanuel's sanctuary features a large wood sculpture in the shape of a banyan tree. The sculpture was made from Maryland tulip poplar trees. The sculpture symbolizes one of Temple Emanuel's guiding beliefs, to blend Judaism and sustainability. In 1994, Temple Emanuel completed an energy audit of its building. Temple Emanuel recycles and composts, and it includes an environmental reading into Shabbat services. The lighting, heating, cooling, and energy efficiency is monitored in every room of the building. Children maintain an organic garden on the grounds. Rabbi Stone strongly supports the congregation's efforts to be sustainable, citing a passage in the Midrash. The Religious Action Center of Reform Judaism awarded 2013 Irving J. Fain Social Action Award to Temple Emanuel for its activities in support of social justice and tikkun olam.

=== Other social issues ===
In 2005, Temple Emanuel was one of many Jewish congregations organizations that demanded the United States act to end the genocide occurring in Darfur, Sudan.

In 2012, Temple Emanuel encouraged its members to support the Civil Marriage Protection Act, to allow people of the same sex to marry in Maryland.

In 2014, Temple Emanuel resolved to support an increase in the minimum wage so workers can "support themselves with greater dignity and independence — a true Jewish value. ... It is a religious responsibility to care for the needy of our society and safeguard a just minimum wage."

== See also ==
- History of the Jews in Maryland
