= Garrett Park station =

MARC rail station in Garrett Park, Maryland, United States

Garrett Park
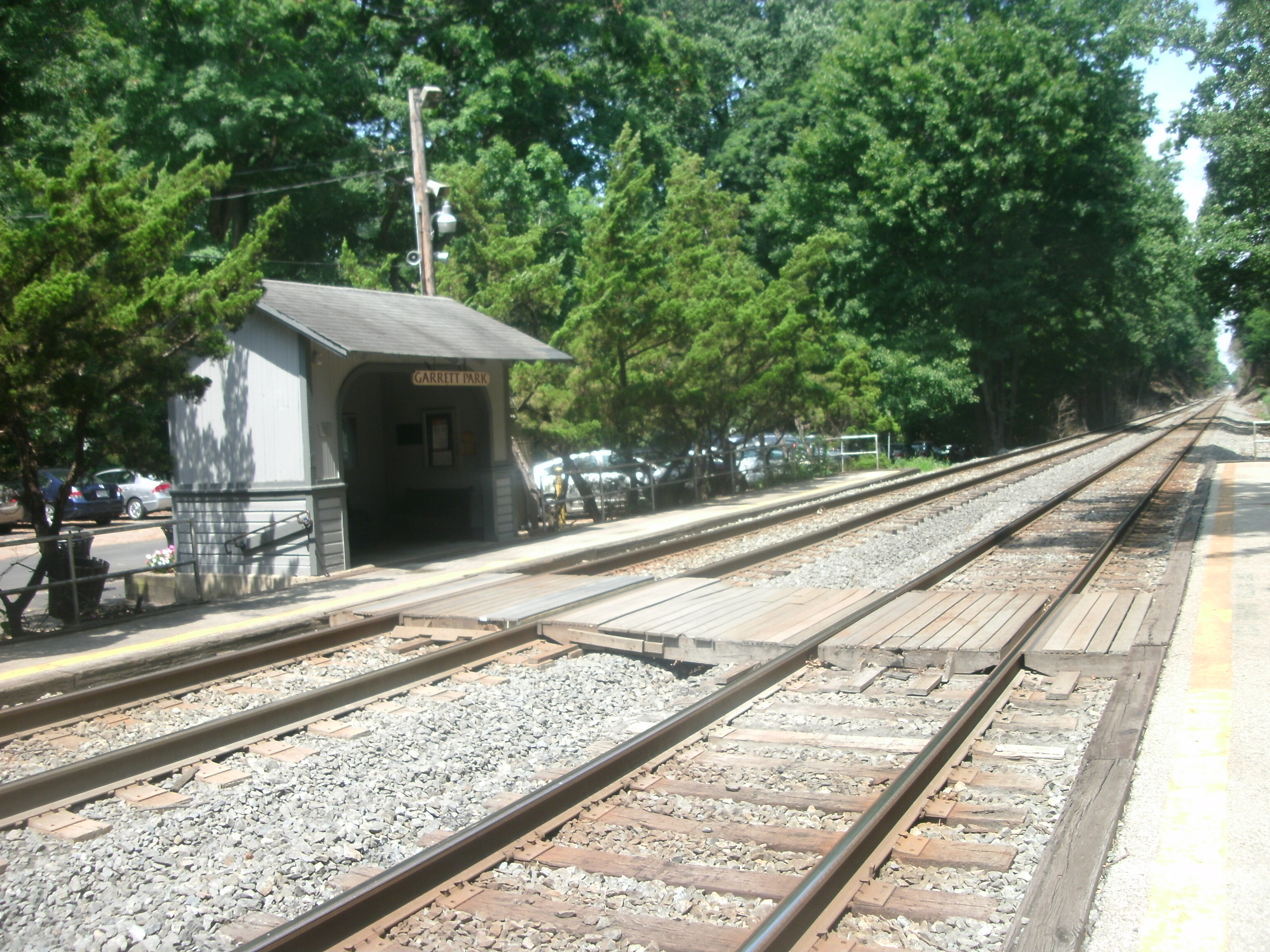
- Garrett Park station as seen in July 2012, facing Martinsburg

General information
- Location: 11015 Rokeby Avenue, Garrett Park, Maryland
- Coordinates: 39.0389°N 77.0936°W
- Line: Metropolitan Subdivision
- Platforms: 2 side platforms
- Tracks: 2

Construction
- Parking: 22 spaces
- Accessible: No

Passengers
- November 2022: 18 (daily) (MARC)

Services
Preceding station	MARC	Following station
Rockville toward Martinsburg or Frederick	Brunswick Line	Kensington toward Union Station
Former services
Preceding station	Baltimore and Ohio Railroad	Following station
Rockville toward Chicago	Main Line	Kensington toward Jersey City
Randolph toward Chicago	Main Line	Kensington toward Jersey City
Location

Garrett Park is a commuter rail station in Garrett Park, Maryland, United States. It is served by limited trains on the MARC Brunswick Line, some of which stop at the station and some of which are flag stops. The station has limited parking on the adjacent street.

== Station layout ==
The station has two low-level concrete side platforms and a small shelter on the inbound platform. The shelter was originally located at the former Landover commuter rail station. The platform is long enough for three single-level cars to platform, although only one set of doors is typically opened. The station is not compliant with the Americans with Disabilities Act of 1990, lacking raised platforms for level boarding.
