= Kensington Historic District =

Historic district in Maryland, United States

- U.S. National Register of Historic Places
- U.S. Historic district
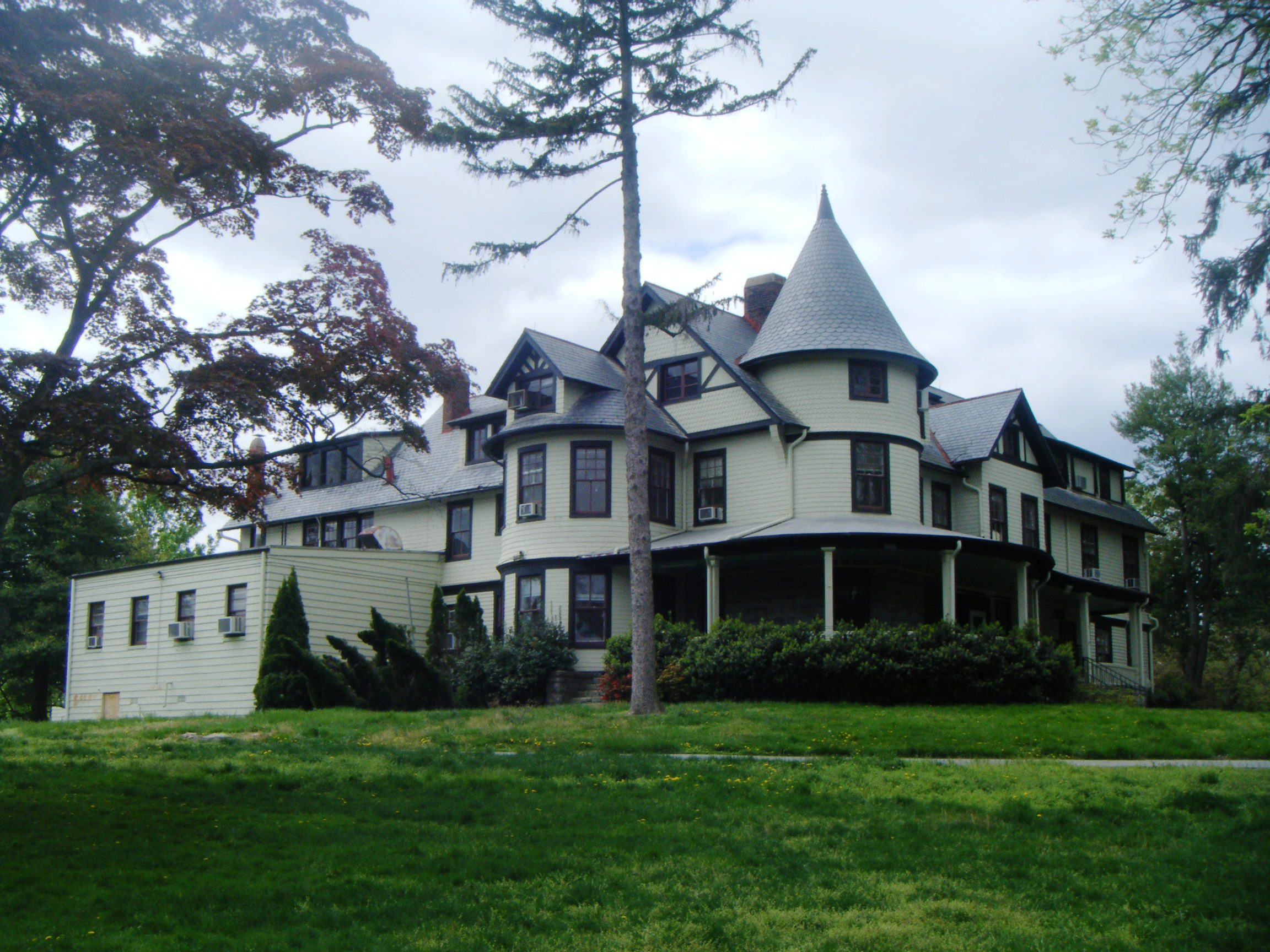
- The Kensington House for the Blind, located at the center of the historic district

- Location within Maryland Location within the United States
- Location: Roughly bounded by RR tracks, Kensington Pkwy., Summit Ave. Washington and Warner Sts., Kensington, Maryland
- Coordinates: 39°1′29″N 77°4′33″W
- Area: 75 acres (30 ha)
- Built: 1891
- Architect: Woltz, Edward; Medford, T.M.
- Architectural style: Colonial Revival, Late Victorian, Mission/spanish Revival
- NRHP reference No.: 80001827
- Added to NRHP: September 4, 1980

The Kensington Historic District is a national historic district located at Kensington, Montgomery County, Maryland. The district includes the core of the original town that was incorporated in 1894. It is dominated by large late-19th and early-20th-century houses, many with wraparound porches, stained-glass windows, and curving brick sidewalks. Large well-kept lawns, ample sized lots, flowering shrubbery, and tree-lined streets contribute to the historic environment which Kensington still retains despite its proximity to Washington, D.C.

It was listed on the National Register of Historic Places in 1980.

== See also ==
- Kensington (MARC station)
