= Garrett Park Historic District =

Historic district in Maryland, United States

- U.S. National Register of Historic Places
- U.S. Historic district
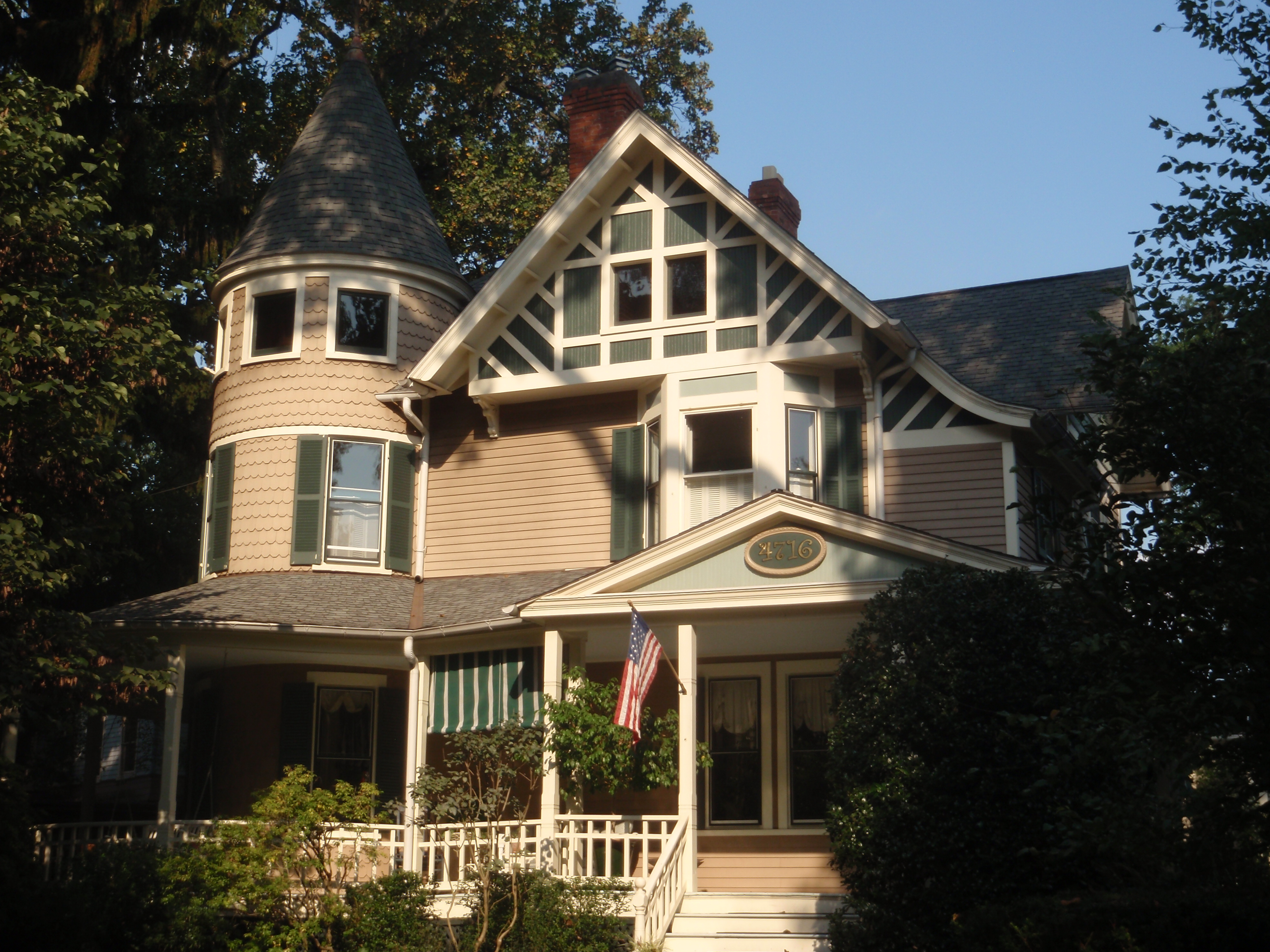
- House in Garrett Park Historic District, September 2012

- Location within Maryland Location within the United States
- Location: Roughly bounded by B & O Railroad tracks, Rock Creek Park, and Flanders Ave., Garrett Park, Maryland
- Coordinates: 39°2′9″N 77°5′41″W
- Area: 154 acres (62 ha)
- Built: 1887
- Architect: Maddux, Marshall & Co.; Richter, Alexander
- Architectural style: Late 19th And Early 20th Century American Movements, Late 19th And 20th Century Revivals, Late Victorian
- NRHP reference No.: 75000910
- Added to NRHP: January 31, 1975

The Garrett Park Historic District is a national historic district located at Garrett Park, Montgomery County, Maryland. It's a 154-acre (62 ha) residential community incorporated in 1891, along the B & O Railroad. The older community includes a number of late Victorian homes. During the 1920s, the town expanded with a set of 40,640-square-foot (3,776 m^{2}), "Chevy" houses built by Maddux, Marshall & Co. The district also includes a set of Prairie Style homes designed and built by Alexander Richter during the 1950s.

It was listed on the National Register of Historic Places in 1975.
