= Kensington, Maryland =

- Town
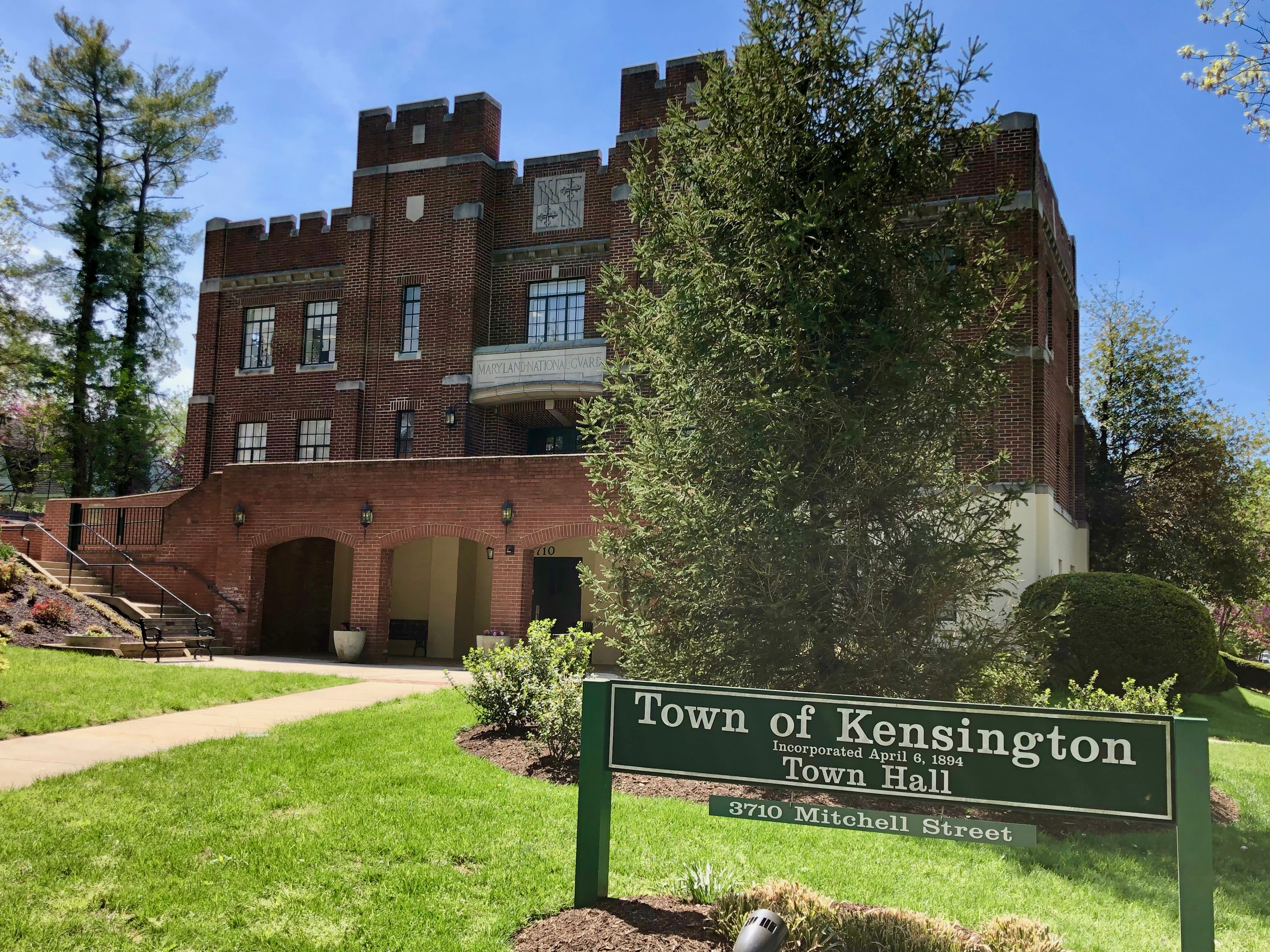
- Kensington Town Hall

- Flag Logo

- Location of Kensington in Montgomery County and Maryland
- Coordinates: 39°01′37″N 77°04′25″W
- Country: United States
- State: Maryland
- County: Montgomery
- Incorporated: 1894

Government
  - Mayor: Tracey Furman

Area
  - Total: 0.50 sq mi (1.30 km^{2})
  - Land: 0.50 sq mi (1.30 km^{2})
  - Water: 0 sq mi (0.00 km^{2})
- Elevation: 299 ft (91 m)

Population (2020)
  - Total: 2,122
  - Density: 4,222.6/sq mi (1,630.37/km^{2})
- Time zone: UTC-5 (Eastern (EST))
  - Summer (DST): UTC-4 (EDT)
- ZIP code: 20895
- Area codes: 301, 240
- FIPS code: 24-43500
- GNIS feature ID: 2391252
- Website: tok.md.gov

Kensington is a town in Montgomery County, Maryland, United States. The population was 2,122 at the 2020 United States census. Greater Kensington had a population of 19,753 in 2020.

== History ==
Kensington Plat (c. 1890)

The area around Rock Creek where Kensington is located was primarily agricultural until 1873, when the B&O Railroad completed the Metropolitan Branch across Montgomery County. A community arose where the new railroad line intersected the old Rockville-to-Bladensburg road. This early settlement was first known as "Knowles Station".

In the early 1890s, Washington developer Brainard Warner began purchasing land parcels to build a planned Victorian community, complete with church, library, and local newspaper. Fascinated by a recent trip to London, Warner named his development "Kensington Park", the tenth and largest subdivision in the area. When the town was incorporated in 1894, Warner convinced the mayor and council to name it Kensington.

Originally a farming community at Knowles Station, Kensington developed into a summer refuge for Washington residents wishing to escape the capital's humidity. As years passed and more residents remained year-round, Kensington evolved into a commuter suburb. Commuters reached downtown Washington, D.C., on B&O passenger trains and, beginning in 1895, a streetcar line founded as Chevy Chase Lake & Kensington Railway and later called the Kensington Railway Company.

The large southernmost section originally mapped out by Warner remains largely unchanged, and is a historically preserved zone. The only major changes in the town's basic layout have been the bridging of the original railroad crossing in 1937, and the extension and widening of Connecticut Avenue, the town's main thoroughfare, in 1957. As well, the right-of-way of the streetcar line, which was replaced with bus service in 1935, was paved to become Kensington Parkway.

In March 1975, Kensington gained attention regionally when Sheila and Katherine Lyon walked to Wheaton Plaza, a local shopping mall, and never returned home. Their abduction and murder was solved only in 2017.

The historic core of Kensington was listed on the National Register of Historic Places as the Kensington Historic District in 1980.

In the early 21st century, the town gained national attention three times in 10 months for events within a quarter-mile radius. In December 2001, the town responded to complaints from anonymous citizens by banning Santa Claus from the annual holiday parade. Protesters arrived at the parade en masse, including dozens of Santas riding everything from motorcycles to fire trucks. Eight months later, an Amtrak train derailed near the town center when the tracks separated at an overheated joint, injuring 95. And on October 2, 2002, Lori Ann Lewis-Rivera became the fifth victim of the "Beltway snipers" while cleaning her car at a Kensington gas station.

== Geography ==
According to the U.S. Census Bureau, the town has a total area of 0.50 square miles (1.29 km^{2}), all land.

== Demographics ==
Historical population
Census	Pop.	Note	%±
1900	477		—
1910	689		44.4%
1920	874		26.9%
1930	948		8.5%
1940	931		−1.8%
1950	1,611		73.0%
1960	2,175		35.0%
1970	2,322		6.8%
1980	1,822		−21.5%
1990	1,713		−6.0%
2000	1,873		9.3%
2010	2,213		18.2%
2020	2,122		−4.1%
U.S. Decennial Census

=== 2020 census ===
As of the 2020 census, Kensington had a population of 2,122. The median age was 40.7 years. 28.0% of residents were under the age of 18 and 13.3% of residents were 65 years of age or older. For every 100 females there were 91.2 males, and for every 100 females age 18 and over there were 84.4 males age 18 and over.

100.0% of residents lived in urban areas, while 0.0% lived in rural areas.

There were 743 households in Kensington, of which 46.6% had children under the age of 18 living in them. Of all households, 60.3% were married-couple households, 12.8% were households with a male householder and no spouse or partner present, and 24.0% were households with a female householder and no spouse or partner present. About 19.1% of all households were made up of individuals and 8.4% had someone living alone who was 65 years of age or older.

There were 789 housing units, of which 5.8% were vacant. The homeowner vacancy rate was 1.3% and the rental vacancy rate was 8.8%.

Racial composition as of the 2020 census
Race	Number	Percent
White	1,451	68.4%
Black or African American	150	7.1%
American Indian and Alaska Native	2	0.1%
Asian	142	6.7%
Native Hawaiian and Other Pacific Islander	0	0.0%
Some other race	120	5.7%
Two or more races	257	12.1%
Hispanic or Latino (of any race)	324	15.3%

=== 2010 census ===
As of the 2010 census, there were 2,213 people, 870 households, and 563 families residing in the town. The population density was 4,610.4 inhabitants per square mile (1,780.1/km^{2}). There were 902 housing units at an average density of 1,879.2 per square mile (725.6/km^{2}). The racial makeup of the town was 82.0% White, 6.1% African American, 0.1% Native American, 5.7% Asian, 0.1% Pacific Islander, 2.8% from other races, and 3.2% from two or more races. Hispanic or Latino of any race were 6.4% of the population.

There were 870 households, of which 33.7% had children under the age of 18 living with them, 51.8% were married couples living together, 10.0% had a female householder with no husband present, 2.9% had a male householder with no wife present, and 35.3% were non-families. 27.1% of all households were made up of individuals, and 10.5% had someone living alone who was 65 years of age or older. The average household size was 2.54 and the average family size was 3.17.

The median age in the town was 42.1 years. 26.2% of residents were under the age of 18; 5% were between the ages of 18 and 24; 24% were from 25 to 44; 30% were from 45 to 64; and 14.8% were 65 years of age or older. The gender makeup of the town was 47.6% male and 52.4% female.

=== 2000 census ===
As of the 2000 census, the median income for a household in the town was $76,716, and the median income for a family was $96,394. Males had a median income of $65,804 versus $41,364 for females. The per capita income for the town was $35,919. About 0.9% of families and 2.1% of the population were below the poverty line, including none of those under age 18 and 1.3% of those age 65 or over.

== Economy ==
Commercial enterprises include Antique Row, the West Howard Antique District, and Kaiser-Permanente's Kensington facility.

== Arts and culture ==
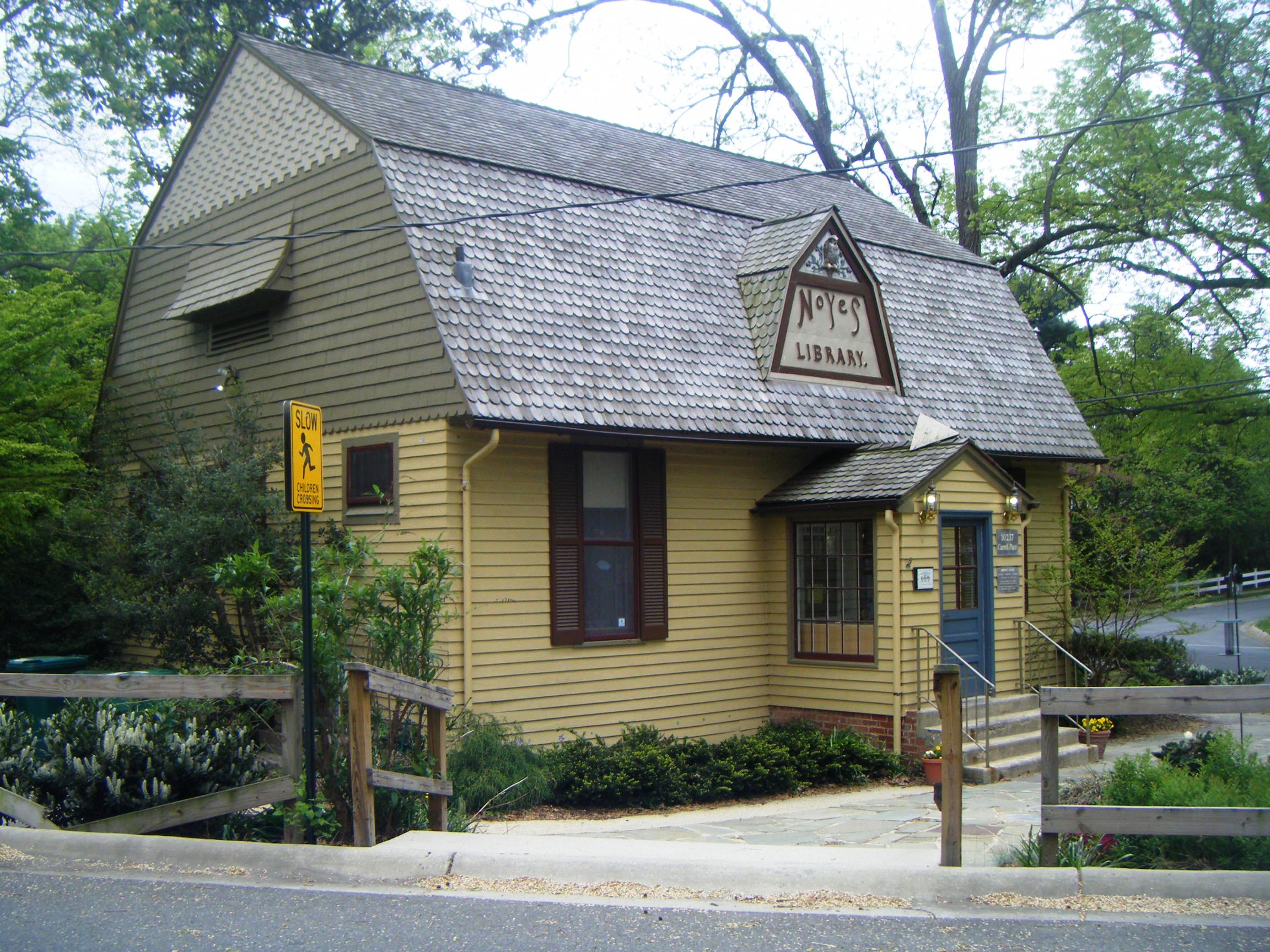
The Noyes Library, Montgomery County's oldest library, is located in the Kensington Historic District.

The Noyes Library for Young Children in Kensington is Montgomery County's oldest public library.

=== Events ===
- Kensington Day of the Book Festival (World Book Day) features live music, author readings, open mic, storytellers, and books
- Labor Day parade
- The Kensington 8K Race, founded in 1994
- Kensington parkrun

=== Places of worship ===
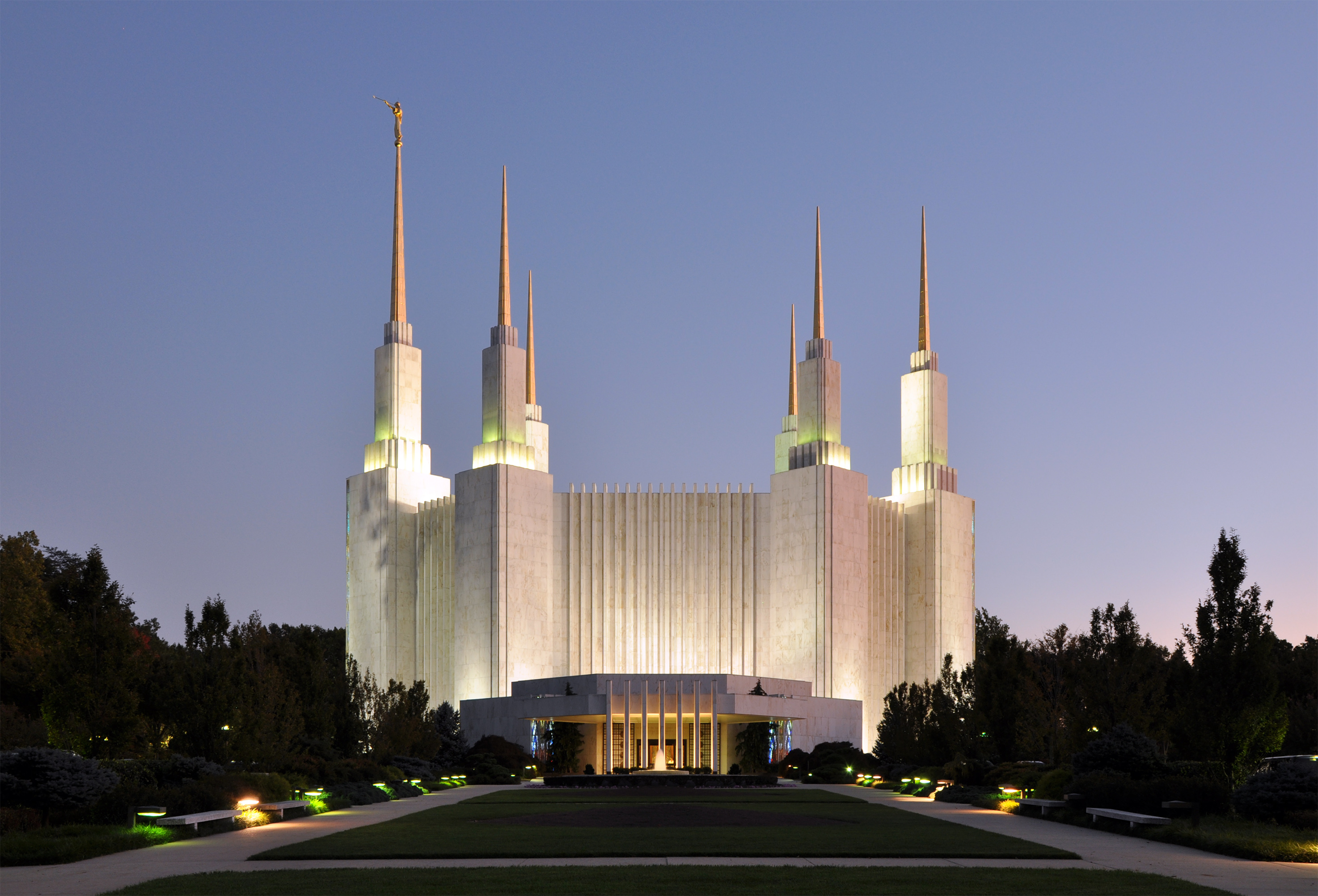
The LDS Washington D.C. Temple

- Temple Emmanuel
- Washington D.C. Temple of the Church of Jesus Christ of Latter-day Saints

== Government ==
A mayoral election is held in even-numbered years for a two-year term. Kensington has a four-member council, elected for two-year terms. Terms are staggered. Every year there are two council seats up for election. The mayor is Tracey Furman.

== Education ==
Public education is administered by Montgomery County Public Schools. Schools located in Kensington include:

- Albert Einstein High School
- Garrett Park Elementary School
- Kensington Parkwood Elementary School
- Newport Mill Middle School
- Rock View Elementary School
- Silver Creek Middle School
- Stephen Knolls School

Private schools include:

- Spring Bilingual Montessori Academy
- Kensington Nursery School
- Holy Redeemer Catholic School, a Roman Catholic parochial school
- Grace Episcopal Day School
- Academy of the Holy Cross, an all-girls Roman Catholic high school

== Infrastructure ==
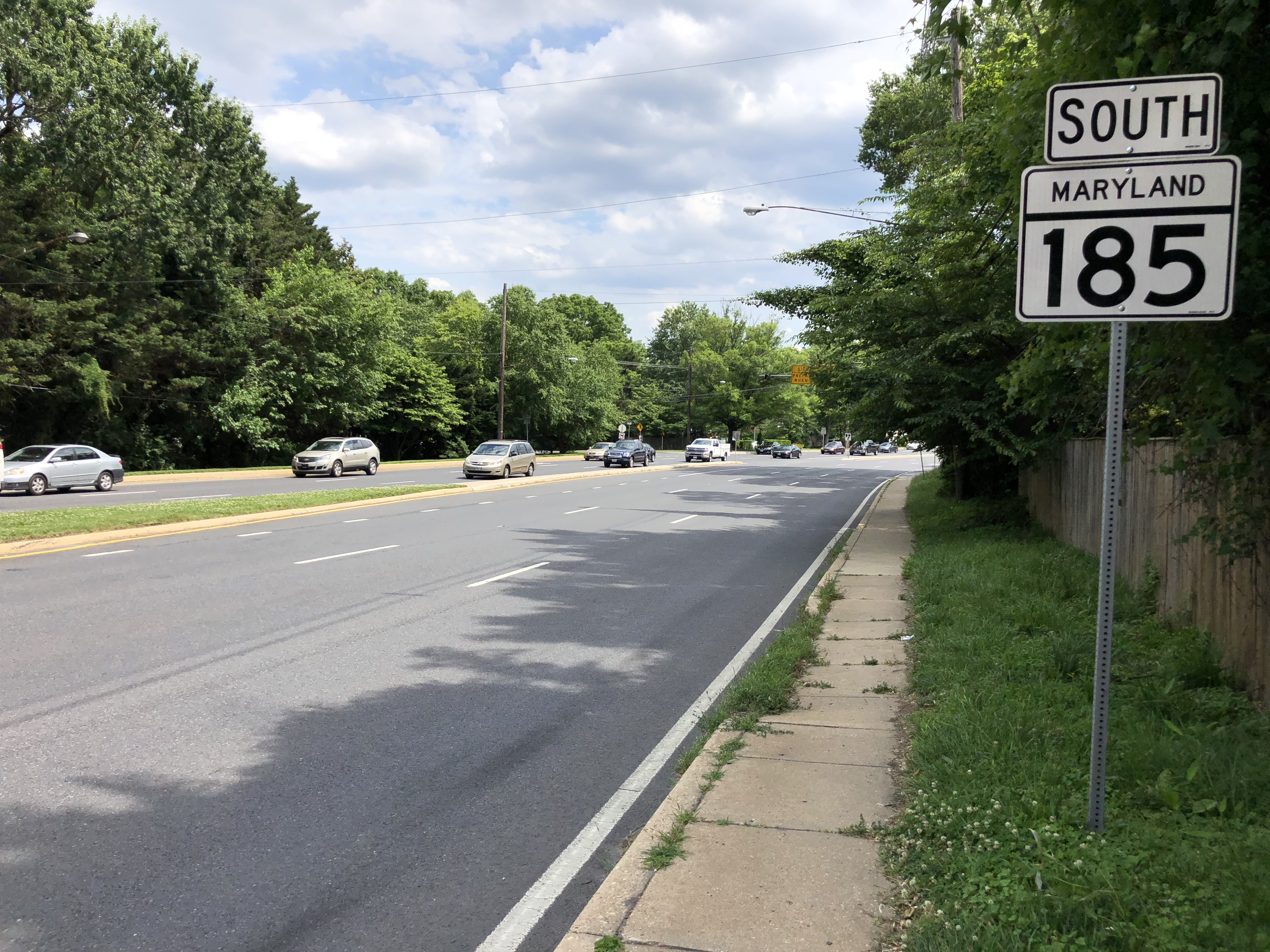
MD 185 southbound in Kensington

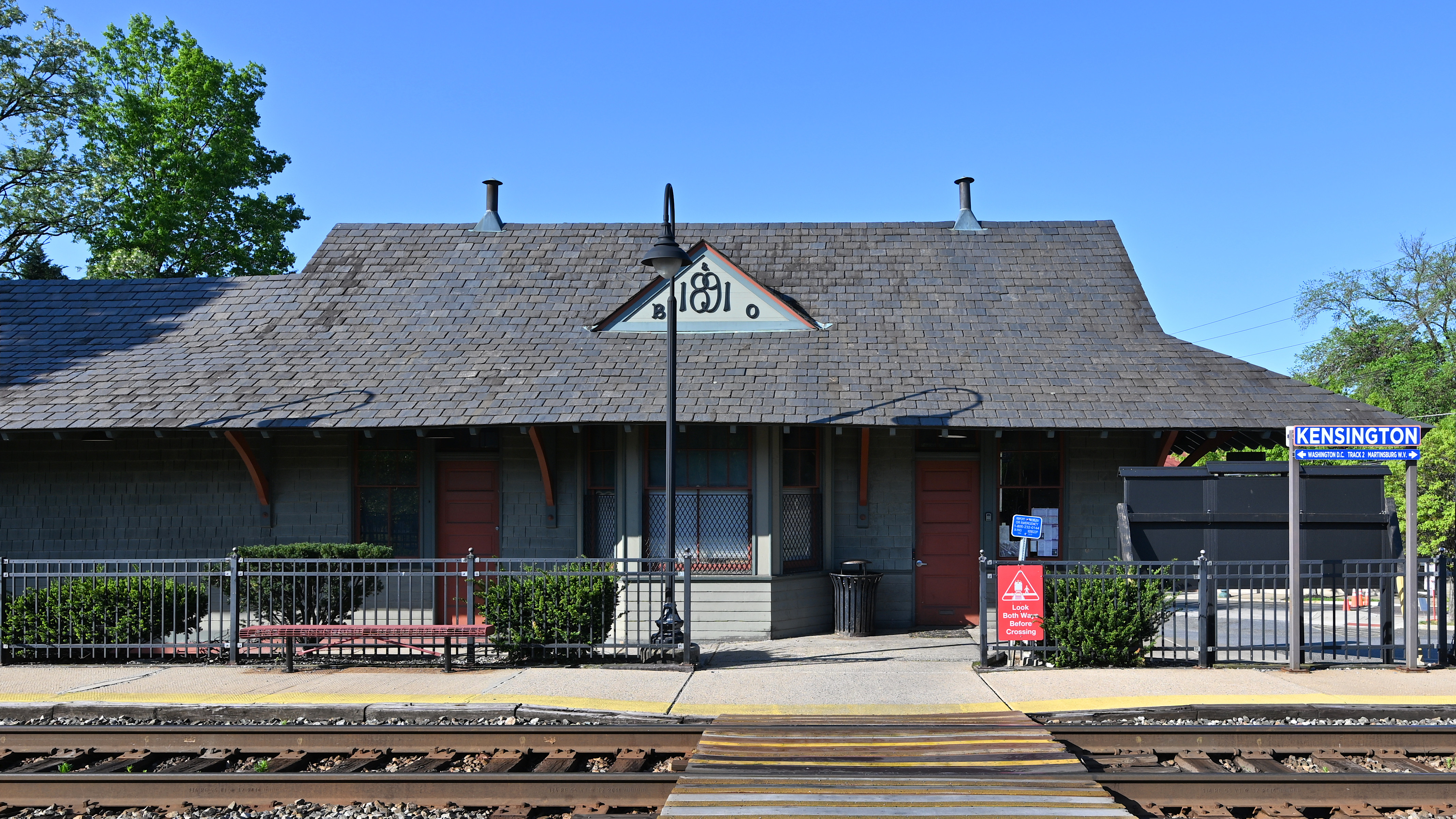
Kensington railroad station, built in 1891, now used as a MARC Train station

=== Transportation ===
Highways include:

- Maryland Route 185 (Connecticut Avenue)
- Interstate 495 (the Capital Beltway)
- Maryland Route 193
- Maryland Route 192
- Maryland Route 547

The MARC Train on the Brunswick Line stops at Kensington station.

Ride On provides bus service.

== Notable people ==
- Avedon Carol (born 1951), British writer and feminist
- Alfred A. Starbird (1875–1956), US Army brigadier general
- Philip Terzian (born 1950), American journalist
- Chris Van Hollen (born 1959), U.S. senator; former U.S. congressman, state senator, and state delegate
- Thomas M. Watlington (1904–1990), US Army major general, lived in Kensington during retirement

== See also ==
- Kensington station (Maryland)
