= Violette's Lock =

Lock on the Chesapeake & Ohio Canal

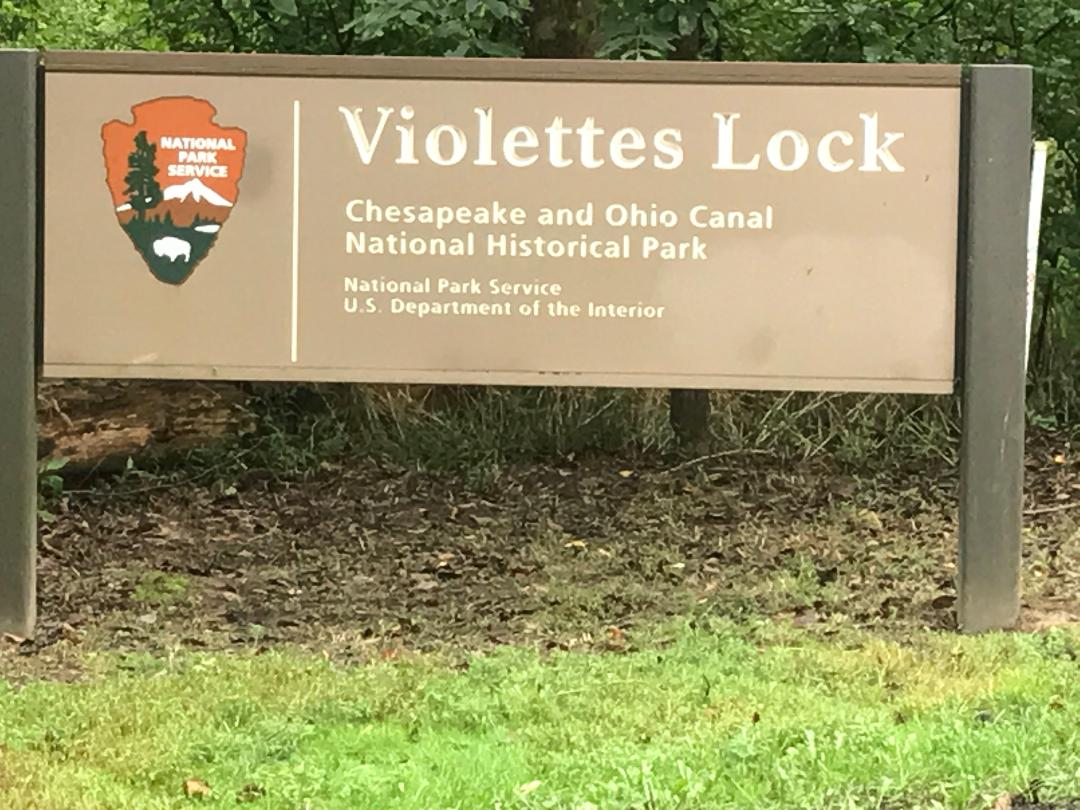
- Violette's Lock (Lock No. 23)
- Interactive map of Violette's Lock
- 39.067226°N 77.328483°W
- Waterway: Chesapeake and Ohio Canal
- Country: USA
- State: Maryland
- County: Montgomery
- Operation: Defunct
- Towpath milemarker 22.1

Violette's Lock (Lock 23) is part of the 184.5-mile (296.9 km) Chesapeake and Ohio Canal (a.k.a. C&O Canal) that operated in the United States along the Potomac River from the 1830s through 1923. It is located at towpath mile-marker 22.1, in Montgomery County, Maryland. The name Violette comes from Alfred L. "Ap" Violette and his wife Kate, who were lock keepers from the beginning of the 20th century through the permanent closure of the canal in 1924.

Lock 23, a lift lock, is adjacent to a guard (a.k.a. inlet) lock used to add water to the canal. A dam was also nearby. All three were built during 1829 through 1831. Construction of an aqueduct upriver took longer than other downriver portions of the canal, causing the first phase of canal operation to be between Georgetown and Lock 23. Construction of the entire canal was completed in 1850, and connected Cumberland in Western Maryland with Georgetown on the Potomac River. The canal was necessary because portions of the Potomac River upstream from Georgetown were not navigable.

Today, Violette's Lock is part of Chesapeake and Ohio Canal National Historical Park. The site is one of the few lift locks with an adjacent inlet lock and (the remnants of) a dam. A picnic table, a restroom, parking, and a canoe ramp are available. The lock and surrounding area are known as excellent places for bird watching, and the 40-acre (16 ha) Dierssen Waterfowl Sanctuary is located less than two miles (3.2 km) away between Violette's Lock and the Pennyfield Lock. The locks are connected on land by the canal's towpath, and the path is used by bikers and hikers.

== Background ==
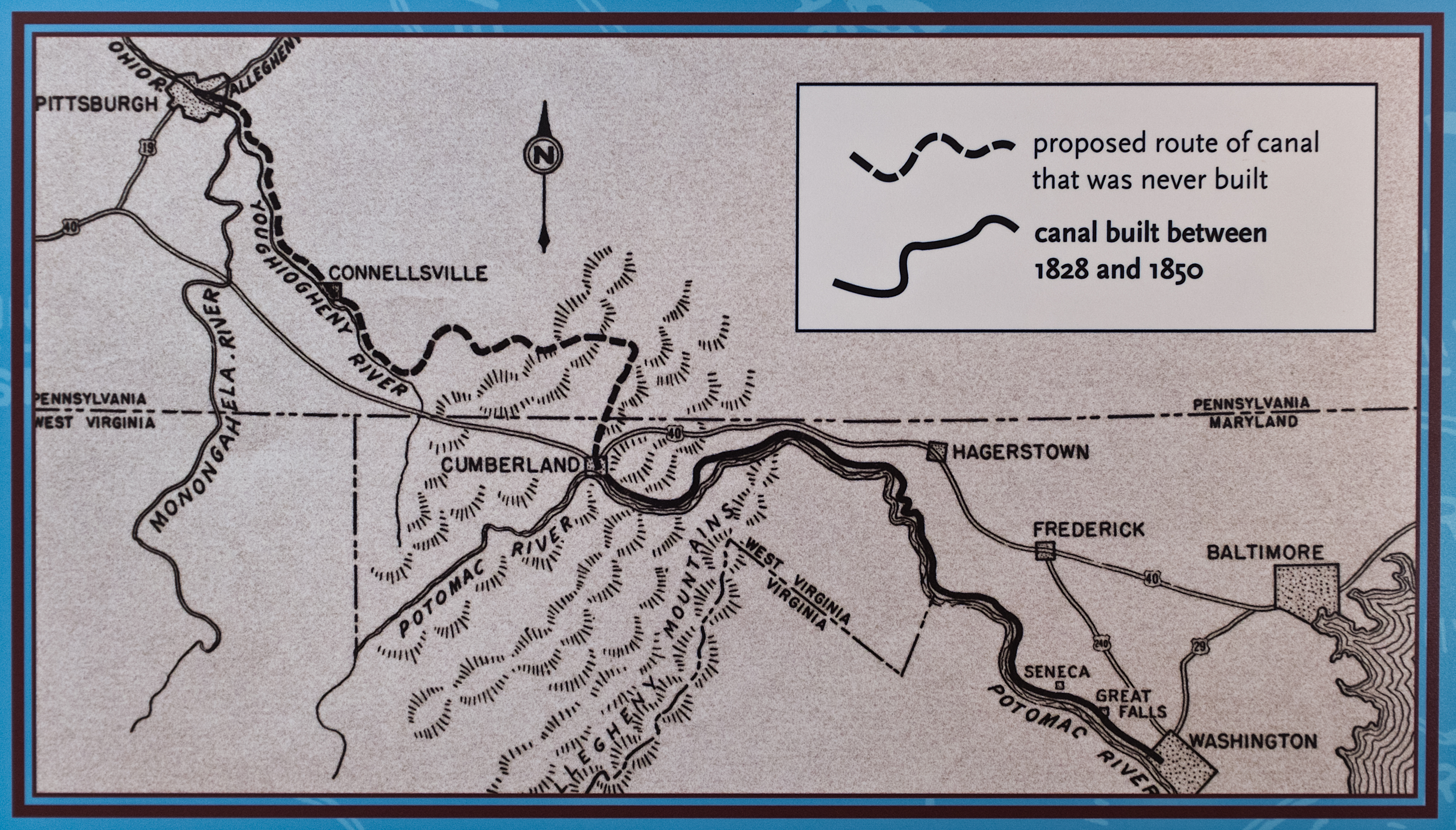
C&O Canal including proposed portion that was never built

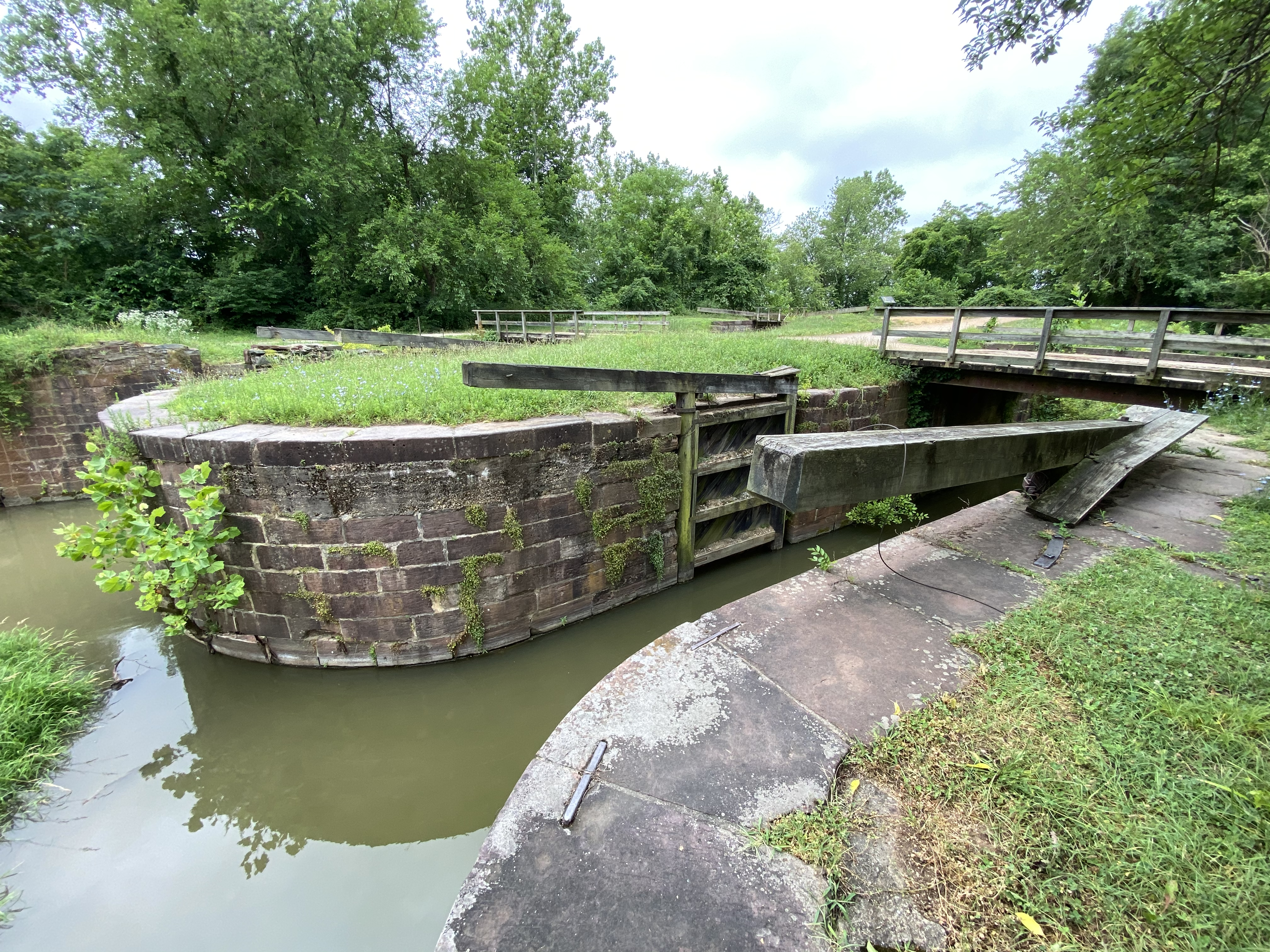
As viewed toward the southwest, Violettes Lock (No. 23) on right and Inlet Lock No. 2 on left

Ground was broken for construction of the Chesapeake and Ohio Canal (a.k.a. C&O Canal) on July 4, 1828. One of the early plans was for the canal to be a way to connect the Chesapeake Bay with the Ohio River—hence the name Chesapeake and Ohio Canal. The canal had several types of locks, including 74 lift locks necessary to handle a 605-foot (184 m) difference in elevation between the two canal ends—an average of about 8 feet (2.4 m) per lock. Violettes Lock, or Lock 23, is the 23rd lift lock when traveling up the canal toward Western Maryland. The canal also had seven guard locks (a.k.a. inlet locks) used to replenish the canal with water from the Potomac River, and Inlet Lock Number 2 at the Lock 23 location is the second inlet lock when traveling up the canal. From Georgetown to Harpers Ferry (includes Lock 23), the canal is 60 feet (18 m) wide at the surface, and 42 feet (13 m) at the bottom. Including walls, lift locks are 100 feet (30 m) long and 15 feet (4.6 m) wide—usable lockage is less. A typical canal freighter had a cargo of up to 120 tons (110 metric tons).

Portions of the canal (close to Georgetown) began operating in the early 1830s, and construction ended in 1850 without reaching the intended Ohio River termination. Upon completion, the canal ran from Georgetown to Cumberland, Maryland. The canal was necessary because the Potomac River has shallow and rocky points and therefore could not serve for reliable navigation, especially at Great Falls. The canal opened the region to important markets and lowered shipping costs. By 1859, about 83 canal boats per week were transporting coal, grain, flour, and farm products to Washington and Georgetown. Tonnage peaked in 1871 as coal trade increased.

The canal faced competition from other modes of transportation, especially the Baltimore and Ohio Railroad (B&O Railroad). Starting in Baltimore and adding line westward, the B&O Railroad eventually reached the Ohio River and beyond, while the C&O Canal never went beyond Cumberland in Western Maryland. An economic depression during the mid-1870s, and major floods in 1877 and 1886, put a financial strain on the C&O Canal Company. In 1889, another flood produced an estimated $1 million (equivalent to $35,833,333 in 2025) in damages and caused the company to enter bankruptcy. Operations stopped for about two years. Court-appointed trustees recommended by the B&O Railroad took over receivership of the canal and began operating it under court supervision, but canal use never recovered to the peak years of the 1870s. The C&O Canal closed for the season in November 1923. Severe flooding in 1924 prevented the canal from opening in the spring, and the resulting damage from the floods prevented it from opening during the entire year. The flood damage, combined with continued competition from railroads and trucks, caused the shutdown to be permanent. In 1938, the canal was sold to the United States government, and the canal was proclaimed a national monument in 1961.

== History ==
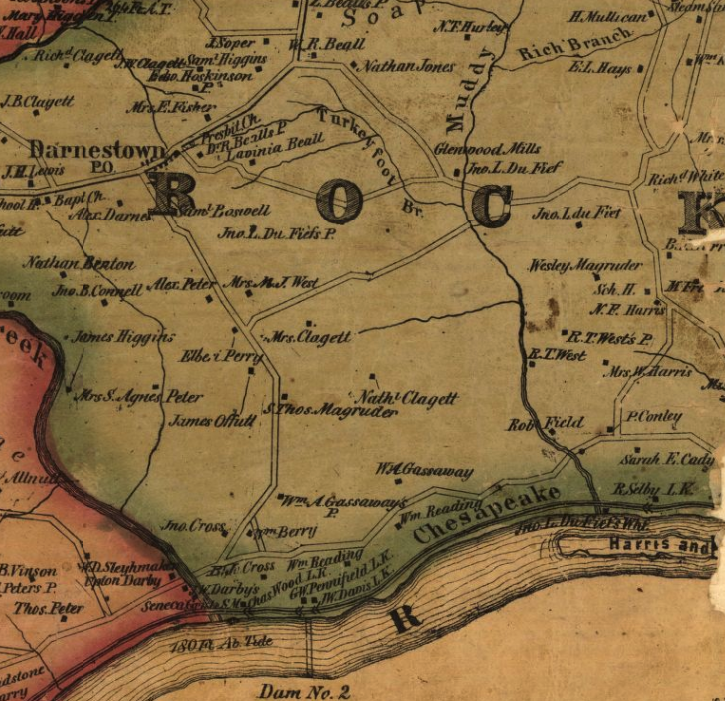
Several lock keepers "L.K." were living near Dam No. 2 (bottom of map) in 1865

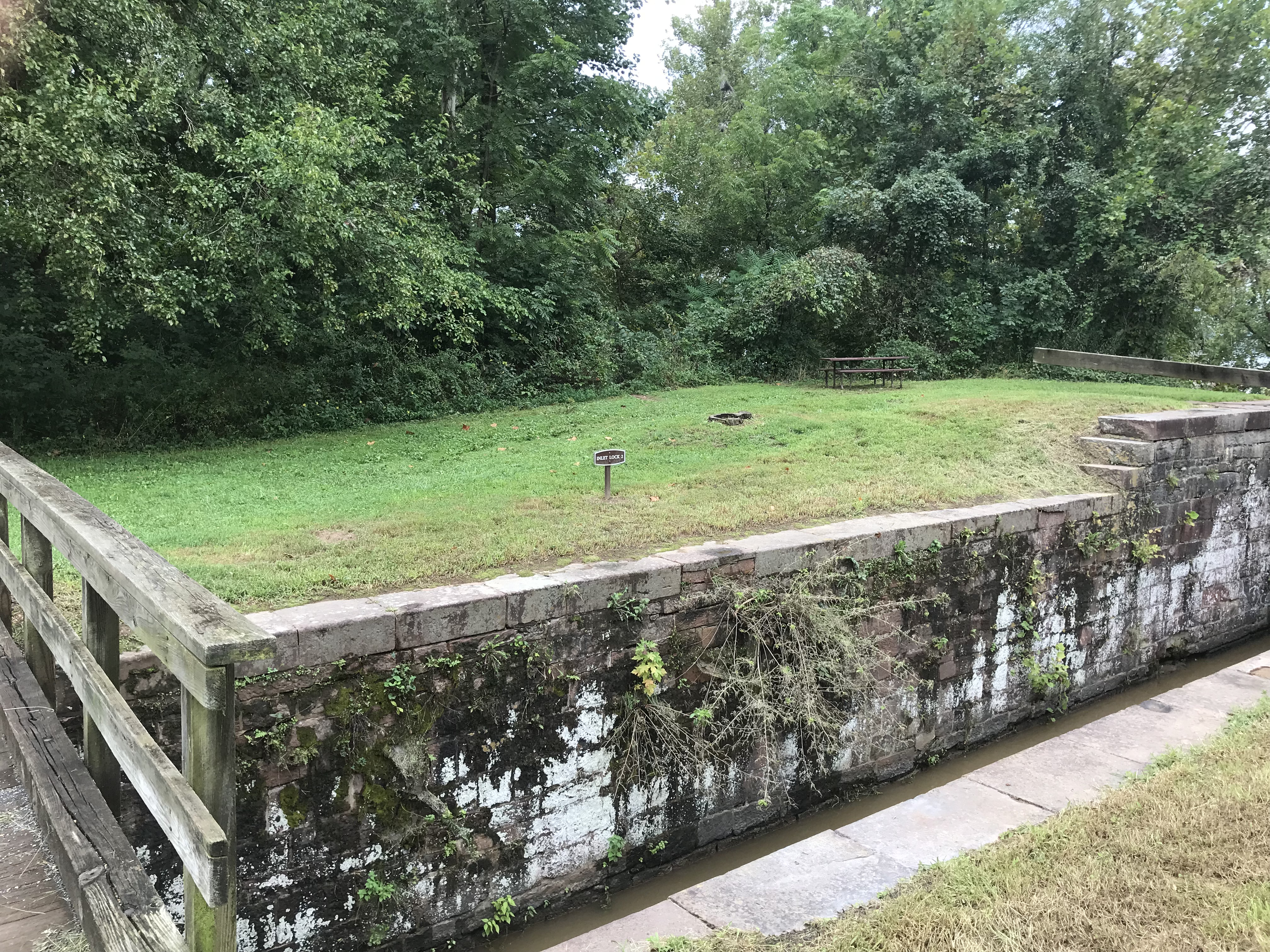
Inlet Lock No. 2 in 2021 with Potomac River behind trees

Construction work on Lock 23 began in June 1829 and was completed January 1831 at a cost of $8,912.80 (equivalent to $269,473 in 2025). The lock was made from Seneca Creek Red Sandstone boated a short distance down the Potomac River from the Seneca Quarry. Construction of the lockhouse began in October 1830. The completion date is unknown, but completion times for several of the nearby lockhouses ranged from six to 12 months. The lockhouse construction cost $958.49 (equivalent to $28,979 in 2025). Dam No. 2 and Guard (Inlet) Lock No. 2 were used to add water to the canal as needed, and they were located next to Lock 23. Work began on Inlet Lock No. 2 during June 1829, and was completed November 1830 at a cost of $7,338.99 (equivalent to $221,890 in 2025). Construction of Dam No. 2 began during July 1829, and was completed during October 1831 at a cost of $26,978.95 (equivalent to $815,692 in 2025). By June 1832, a 22-mile (35 km) section of the canal was operating between Georgetown and Lock 23.

During the summer of 1831, improvements were made to the grounds and lockhouse at Lock 23. It was also decided that the grounds and edifices near Lock 23 would be called Rushville, in honor of Richard Rush. Rush, a diplomat and former Secretary of the Treasury, represented the canal when it sought foreign investors. The expanded lockhouses at Rushville (Lock 23), and Great Falls (Lock 20), enabled them to also be used as places of rest and accommodation for passengers. Lock 23 had temporary importance because it was the beginning of the canal until more portions of the canal opened in 1833. Thus, Rushville thrived from 1829 through 1833. Effective January 1, 1850, the hotel portion of the Rushville house closed down and became used only as a lockhouse.

Some C&O Canal records remain, allowing some of the lock keepers (a.k.a. lock tender) to be identified. Louis Sewell was the original lock tender in 1830. W. H. Hammondtree was listed as lock keeper of Lock No. 23 and Inlet Lock No. 2 on July 1, 1839. He was still listed as lock keeper on May 31, 1842. J.Y. Young was lock keeper on May 31, 1845. Edward L. Trail was lock keeper on December 31, 1846, and still was listed on December 31, 1850. George W. Pennifield, later to become longtime lock keeper of Lock 22, is listed as the lock tender for Lock 23 in 1865. An 1865 map of Montgomery County, Maryland, shows three lock keepers living near Dam No. 2: G.W. Pennifield, J.W. Davis, and Wm Reading.

=== Civil war ===
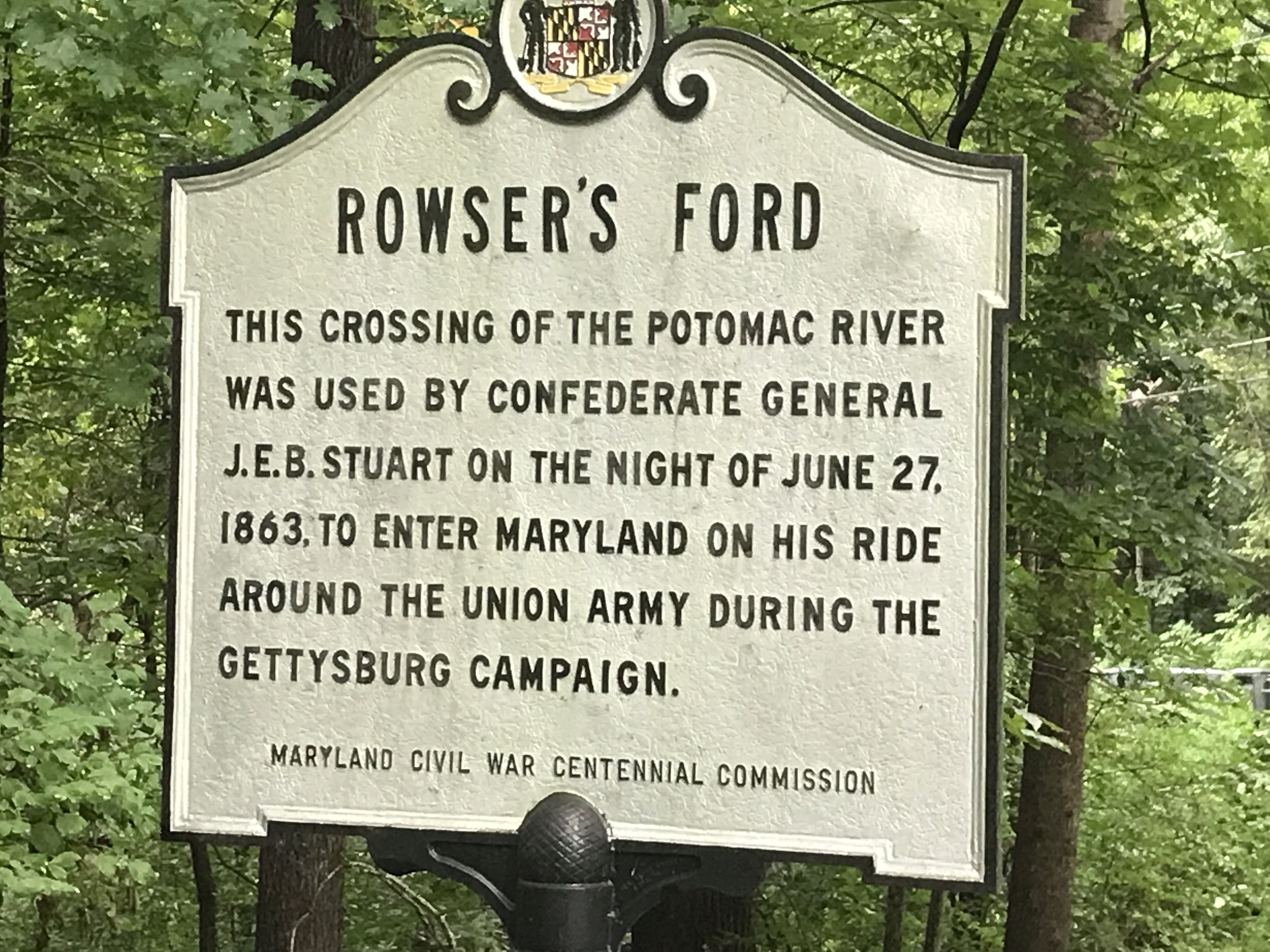
Confederate troops crossed the Potomac near Lock 23

At the beginning of the American Civil War, Union Army leadership realized that the Potomac River area near Locks 23 and 24 was a possible crossing point for a Confederate invasion that could include Washington. The small community of Darnestown, less than 4 miles (6.4 km) north of Lock 24, became occupied in late summer 1861 by 18,000 Union troops. About halfway between Lock 23 and Darnestown, Major General Nathaniel P. Banks kept his headquarters at the Samuel Thomas Magruder farm where the Potomac River could be observed from high ground. By late February 1862, Banks had left Darnestown and was operating in the Shenandoah Valley.

On June 27, 1863, 5,000 cavalry troops under the command of Confederate Major General Jeb Stuart crossed the Potomac River near Lock 24. Intent on disrupting Union supply lines, they seized the canal between Locks 23 and 24, and damaged lock gates, drained water from the canal, and burnt canal boats. From there, they advanced to Rockville, Maryland, before rejoining General Robert E. Lee's Army of Northern Virginia in the Battle of Gettysburg.

=== Violette family ===
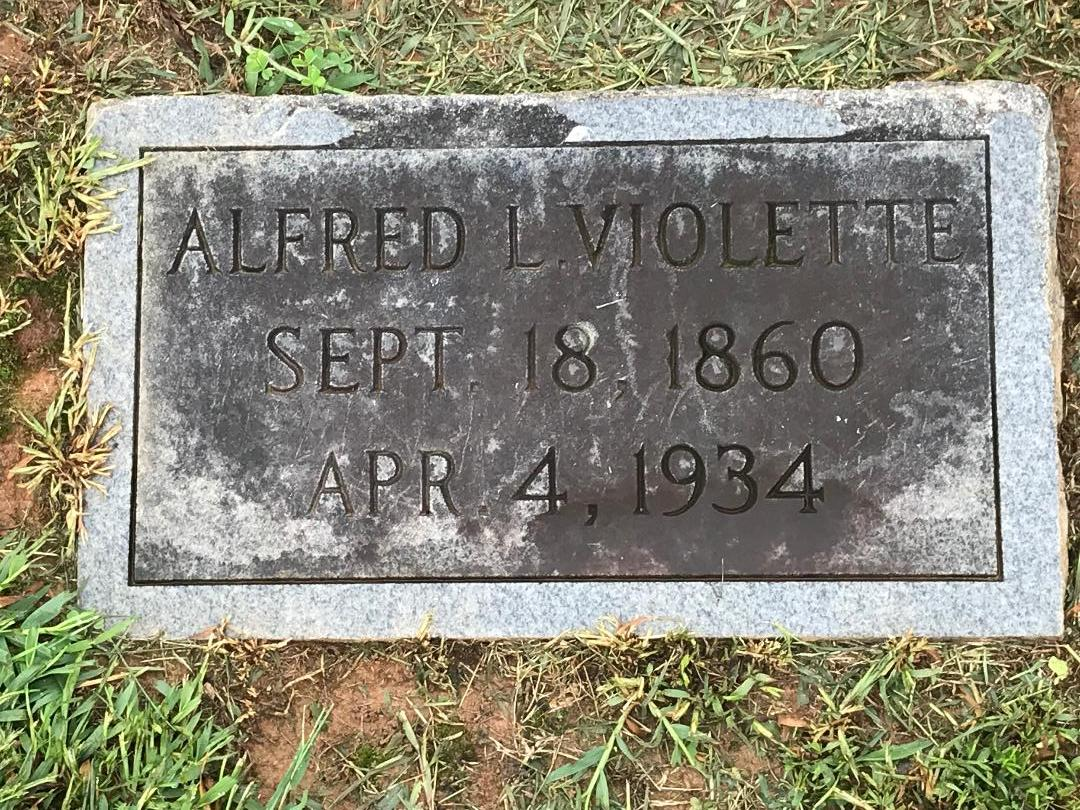
Grave of Alfred L. Violette at the Darnestown Presbyterian Church

Alfred "Ap" Violette was one of the last lock keepers at Lock No. 23. In the late 1800s, he worked at the Seneca quarry before becoming a lock keeper. He became lock keeper at Lock No. 23 early in the 20th century, and lived with his family at the lockhouse. The lock house was a two-story frame house, unlike the typical stone lockhouses at other nearby locks. His wife, Kate, is listed as a lock tender, laborer, and concessionaire circa 1900 through 1942. When Alfred became ill, Kate took over as lock keeper—and she was the last lock keeper at Lock No. 23. The frame lockhouse did not do well in canal floods, and nothing of it remains today. It was destroyed by fire in the 1930s. Alfred L. Violette died on April 4, 1934, and was buried at the Darnestown Presbyterian Church. Although the canal was closed to commercial traffic, Kate Violette was still tending the lock at age 77 in 1938. Sarah Katherine "Kate" Eberhart Violette died on January 1, 1947, and was also buried in Darnestown. She had lived in Seneca for 61 of the 85 years of her life. Today, Lock 23 is known as Violette's Lock in honor of Ap and Kate Violette, and the road that leads to the lock is named Violettes Lock Road (without the apostrophe).

== Today ==
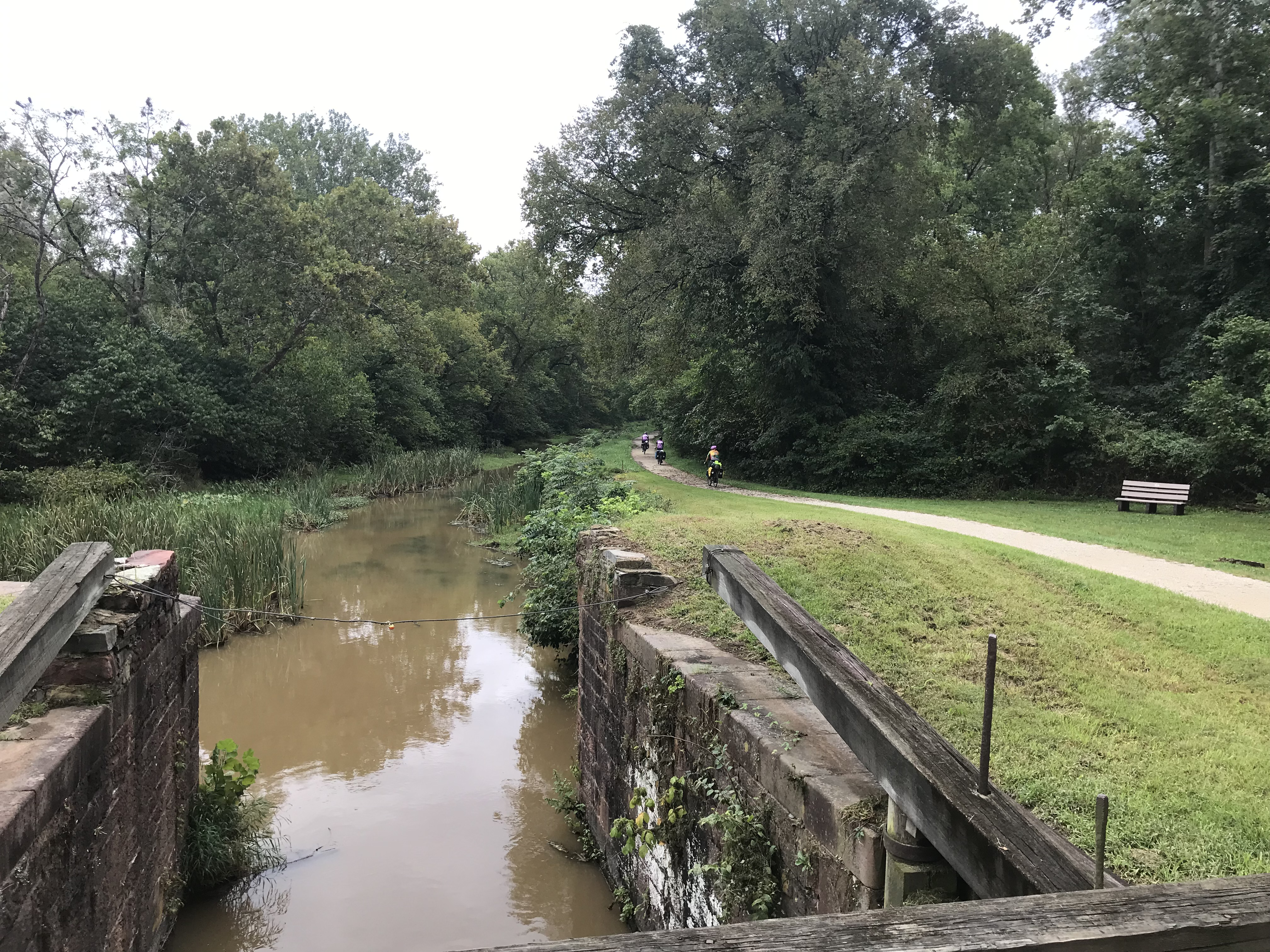
Biking east on towpath at Violettes Lock between the canal and river

Violette's Lock and Inlet Lock 2 are part of the Chesapeake and Ohio Canal National Historical Park. Congress authorized the establishment of the park, and acquisition of adjacent land, in 1971. The lock is listed by the Maryland Ornithological Society as one of the top birdwatching places in Montgomery County, with over 200 species sited.

Although at one time considered part of the tiny community of Rushville and later Seneca, the lock has a Germantown mailing address and is part of the Darnestown census-designated place. Nothing remains from the community of Rushville. The lock can be found by taking Violettes Lock Road off of Montgomery County's River Road. It has a parking lot, a picnic table, a toilet, and a few historical exhibit signs.

== See also ==
- Locks on the Chesapeake and Ohio Canal

== Notes ==
=== References ===
- Balkan, Evan (2008). The Best in Tent Camping: A Guide for Car Campers Who Hate RVs, Concrete Slabs, and Loud Portable Stereos. Birmingham, Alabama: Menasha Ridge Press. ISBN 978-0-89732-755-8. OCLC 1015877303.
- Gray, Karen (March 1, 2003). "History and Engineering Along The Route of the Douglas Hike" (PDF). Along the Towpath. Glen Echo, Maryland: Chesapeake & Ohio Canal Association. Archived (PDF) from the original on July 21, 2021.
- Hullfish, Bill; Ruch, Dave (2019). The Erie Canal Sings: A Musical History of New York's Grand Waterway. Chicago, Illinois: Arcadia Publishing Inc. ISBN 978-1-43966-713-2. OCLC 1104726854.
- Kelly, Clare Lise; Maryland-National Capital Park and Planning Commission (2011). Places from the Past: The Tradition of Gardez Bien in Montgomery County, Maryland – 10th Anniversary Edition (PDF). Silver Spring, Maryland: Maryland-National Capital Park and Planning Commission. ISBN 978-0-97156-070-3. OCLC 48177160. Archived (PDF) from the original on April 12, 2021.
- Kytle, Elizabeth (1996). Home on the Canal. Baltimore, Maryland: Johns Hopkins University Press. ISBN 978-0-80185-328-9. OCLC 1048227577.
- Lowman, Jeff (2015). Paddling Maryland and Washington, DC : A Guide to the Area's Greatest Paddling Adventures. Guilford, Connecticut: FalconGuides. ISBN 978-1-49301-492-7. OCLC 920824361.
- Montgomery County Historical Society (1999). Montgomery County, Maryland – Our History and Government (PDF). Rockville, Maryland: Montgomery County Government Office of Public Relations. Archived (PDF) from the original on May 5, 2021.
- Rubin, Mary H. (2003). The Chesapeake and Ohio Canal. Charleston, South Carolina: Arcadia. ISBN 978-1-43961-250-7. OCLC 904439352.
- Scott, Robert Nicholson (1881). The War of the Rebellion: A Compilation of the Official Records of the Union and Confederate Armies Volume IV Chapter XIV. Washington, DC: Government Printing Office. OCLC 427057. Archived from the original on January 27, 2022.
- Unrau, Harlan D. (1978). Historic Structure Report – The Lockhouses (PDF). Denver, Colorado: National Park Service – United States Department of Interior. Archived (PDF) from the original on January 17, 2019.
- Unrau, Harlan D. (2007). Historic Resource Study: Chesapeake & Ohio Canal (PDF). Hagerstown, Maryland: National Park Service – United States Department of Interior. OCLC 184689456. Archived (PDF) from the original on May 9, 2012.
- U.S. National Park Service Division of Publications (1991). Chesapeake and Ohio Canal: A Guide to Chesapeake and Ohio Canal National Historical Park, Maryland, District of Columbia, and West Virginia. Washington, District of Columbia: United States Government Printing Office. ISBN 9780912627434. OCLC 1020193560. Archived from the original on February 10, 2023.
- Welles, Judith (2019). Potomac. Charleston, South Carolina: Arcadia Publishing. ISBN 978-1-46710-436-4. OCLC 1111392250.
- Youth, Howard (2014). Field Guide to the Natural World of Washington, D.C. Baltimore, Maryland: Johns Hopkins University Press. ISBN 978-1-42141-203-0. OCLC 903126664.
