= Maryland Route 112 =

State highway in Montgomery County, Maryland, US

Maryland Route 112
- Seneca Road
- Maryland Route 112 highlighted in red

Route information
- Maintained by MDSHA
- Length: 2.81 mi (4.52 km)
- Existed: 1927–present

Major junctions
- West end: MD 190 near Seneca
- East end: MD 28 in Darnestown

Location
- Country: United States
- State: Maryland
- Counties: Montgomery

Highway system
- Maryland highway system; Interstate; US; State; Scenic Byways
← MD 109	→ US 113

Maryland Route 112 is a state highway in the U.S. state of Maryland. Known as Seneca Road, the highway runs 2.81 miles (4.52 km) from MD 190 near Seneca east to MD 28 in Darnestown in western Montgomery County. MD 112 was constructed in Darnestown in the early 1920s and extended to Seneca in the late 1920s.

== Route description ==
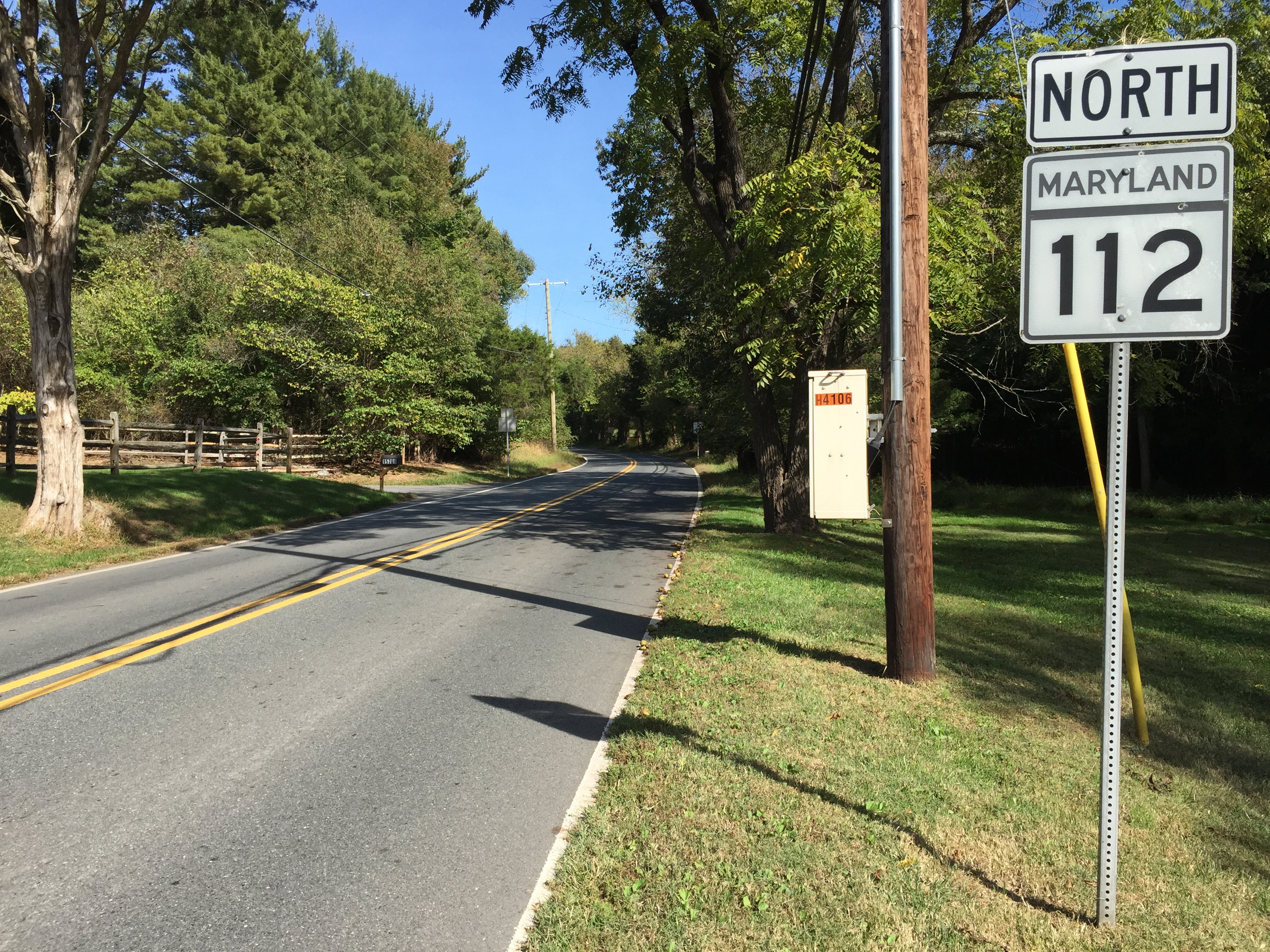
View north at the south end of MD 112 at MD 190 near Seneca

MD 112 begins at a three-legged intersection with River Road that also serves as the western terminus of MD 190. That highway heads southeast toward Potomac; county-maintained River Road heads west through the hamlet of Seneca near the mouth of Seneca Creek and the Seneca Historic District. MD 112 heads east and then northeast as a two-lane undivided road. The highway transitions from rural to suburban surroundings before reaching its eastern terminus at MD 28 (Darnestown Road) in the village of Darnestown.

== History ==
The first segment of MD 112 was a 1-mile (1.6 km) concrete road south from MD 28 in Darnestown that was built in 1923. The highway was extended southwest to the hamlet of Seneca just east of Seneca Creek in 1929 and 1930. MD 112's western terminus was originally a short distance west of MD 190; the highway was truncated at MD 190 between 1975 and 1977.

== Junction list ==
The entire route is in Montgomery County.

Location	mi	km	Destinations	Notes
Seneca	0.00	0.00	MD 190 east (River Road) / River Road west – Potomac	Western terminus; western terminus of MD 190
Darnestown	2.81	4.52	MD 28 (Darnestown Road) – Rockville, Washington, Poolesville, Frederick	Eastern terminus
1.000 mi = 1.609 km; 1.000 km = 0.621 mi
