= Seneca, Maryland =

- Unincorporated community
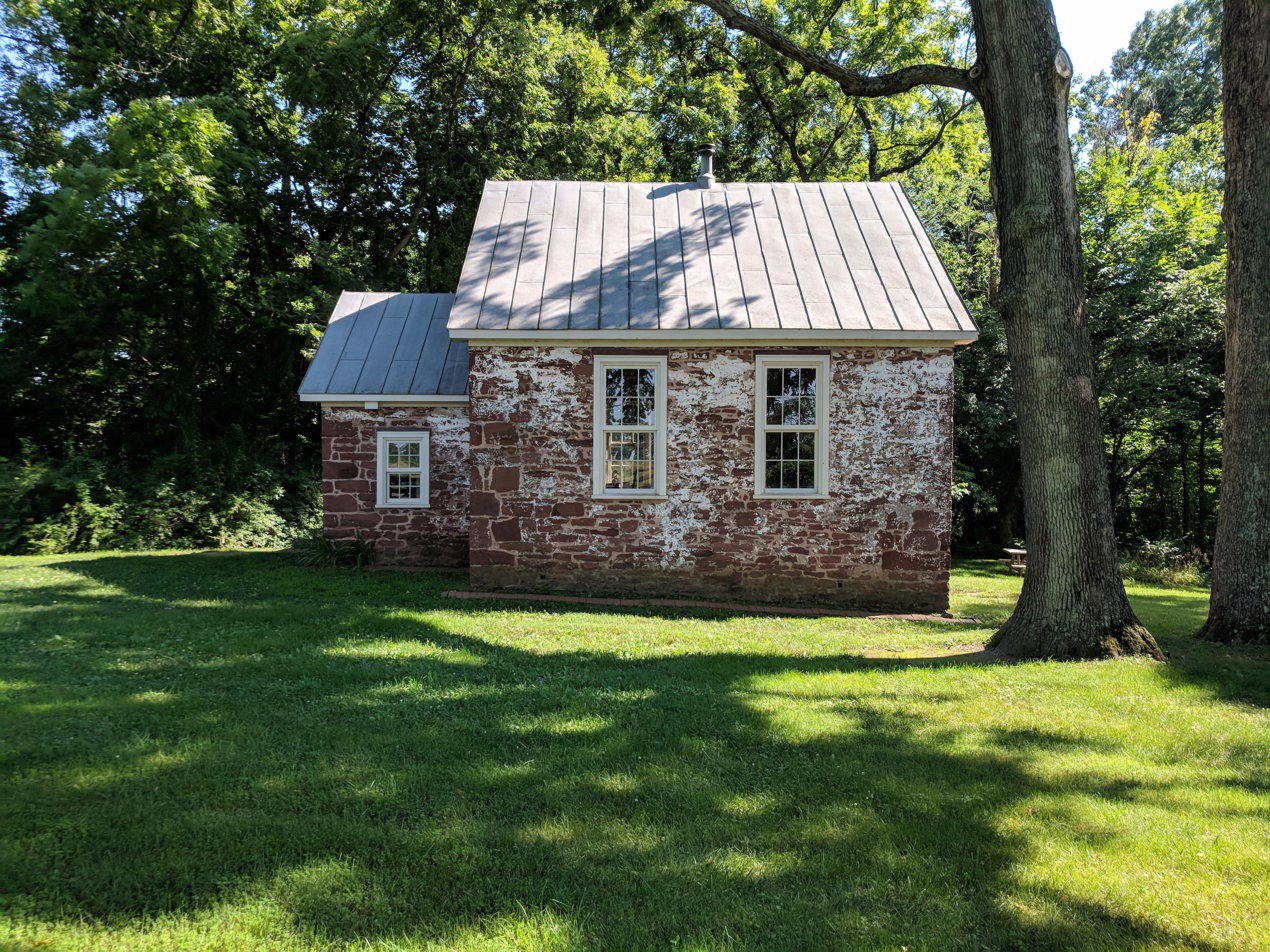
- Seneca Schoolhouse Museum in Seneca, Montgomery County, Maryland

- Location within Maryland Location within the United States
- Country: United States
- State: Maryland
- County: Montgomery
- Time zone: UTC-5 (Eastern (EST))
  - Summer (DST): UTC-4 (EDT)
- ZIP code: 20834

Seneca is an unincorporated community in Montgomery County, Maryland, United States. It is located near the intersection of River Road and Seneca Creek, not far from the Chesapeake and Ohio Canal (C&O Canal) and Potomac River. Its history goes back before the American Revolutionary War and it thrived when the canal was operating—having several warehouses, mills, a store, a hotel, and a school. Fighting occurred in the area on more than one occasion during the American Civil War. The community declined as the C&O Canal declined.

Today (2020), the community uses a Poolesville ZIP code, but is part of the Darnestown census-designated place. The Seneca schoolhouse is a museum, and nearby Riley's Lock and lock house are part of the Chesapeake and Ohio Canal National Historical Park. The community is located near the Dierssen Wildlife Management Area and the McKee-Beshers Wildlife Management Area. Since 1978, Seneca and additional territory have been part of the Seneca Historic District.

== History ==
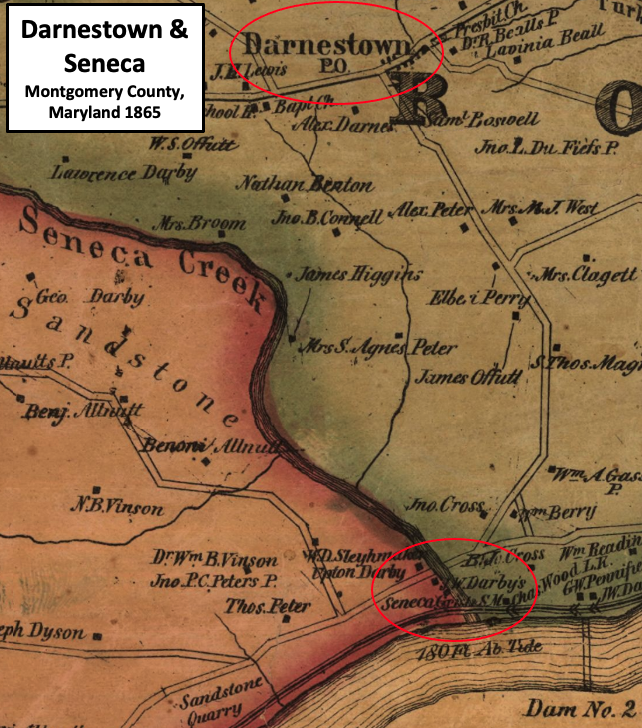
Seneca is close to Seneca Creek, sandstone mines, the C&O Canal, and the Potomac River.

The community of Seneca exists in Montgomery County, Maryland, on Seneca Creek near the Potomac River. The creek was once very powerful, and eight of Montgomery County's 44 mills in existence before 1800 were located on this creek or its tributaries. The Seneca Mill, a gristmill, began operation around 1780, and was located on Seneca Creek close to the Potomac River. In 1781, the state of Maryland confiscated the lands of Daniel Dulany the Younger, a prominent Loyalist to the Crown from Annapolis. His land along the Potomac River included a portion along Seneca Creek, and it was sold to help the state pay for the American Revolutionary War. Robert Peter purchased 2,500 acres (1,000 ha) of the Dulany property in Montgomery County, including the land that contained red sandstone. Not far from Peter's property, John Garrett laid out a community in 1787. He called it Newport, and it was located on the west side of the mouth of Great Seneca Creek, on the Potomac River and about 22 miles (35 km) upriver from Georgetown. The Newport name did not last long—the locals called the community Seneca. Robert Peter died in 1806, and his eldest son Thomas inherited land near Seneca including the quarry. (Note: Thomas Peter was married to Martha Parke "Patty" Custis, step–granddaughter of George Washington. Thomas and Martha's oldest son was John Parke Custis Peter, who developed the Seneca Quarry and constructed its stone-cutting mill around 1837. He died in 1848, and his eldest son Thomas gained control of the mill. The quarry and mill were sold to the Seneca Sandstone Company in 1866. The company went bankrupt in 1876, causing a minor scandal for former president Ulysses S. Grant. In 1901, the mill was closed permanently.)

Construction of the Chesapeake and Ohio Canal (a.k.a. C&O Canal) along the Potomac River began on July 4, 1828. The canal was necessary because portions of the river were too shallow and rocky for freight boat traffic. By that time, the Seneca Quarry and some nearby land on the Potomac River were owned by John Parke Custis Peter, the eldest son of Thomas and Martha Peter. The canal increased the importance of Seneca, and C&O Canal Lock 24, now known as Riley's Lock, is located where the Seneca Aqueduct carries the canal over Seneca Creek near the community. By 1833, enough of the canal was completed to enable canal service between Georgetown and Lock 24, and further upriver—providing access to new markets for Peter's sandstone quarry. Portions of the canal locks and lock houses were constructed using the quarry's distinctive red sandstone. The same quarry, with its own stone-cutting mill, was used to produce material for buildings in Washington such as the Smithsonian Institution Building. The canal also opened markets for area farmers. John Darby, and his son Upton, purchased the Seneca grist mill in 1855. In addition to milling operations, Darby's company shipped products on the C&O Canal. They had a warehouse on the creek (near Lock 24) and their own canal boats.

=== Peak and decline ===
The American Civil War was difficult for the Peter family. Several skirmishes between Union and Confederate troops occurred nearby, including an attack in 1863 that damaged nearby canal infrastructure. (Note: On June 27, 1863, 5,000 cavalry troops under the command of Confederate Major General James "Jeb" Stuart crossed the Potomac River near Lock 24. Intent on disrupting Union supply lines, they seized the canal between Locks 23 and 24, and damaged lock gates, drained water from the canal, and burned canal boats. On July 11, 1864, Confederate partisian rangers led by Colonel John S. Mosby crossed the Potomac River and burned the camp of the 8th Illinois Cavalry Regiment, which was at Blockhouse Point about two miles (3.2 km) southeast of Seneca.) After the war in 1866, the Peter family sold the quarry and nearby property to the newly created Seneca Sandstone Company. Upton Darby donated land for a one-room schoolhouse that was built using red sandstone from the local quarry. An 1879 Montgomery County directory lists Seneca as having "public schools and churches in the vicinity". The community also had a store and post office. However, freight traffic on the C&O Canal had already peaked in 1871, starting a downward trend that would end with the canal closing permanently in 1924. As the canal declined, Seneca declined, and the permanent closure of the canal caused Seneca to lose its relevance. The school closed in 1910.

=== 1950s, 1960s, and today ===
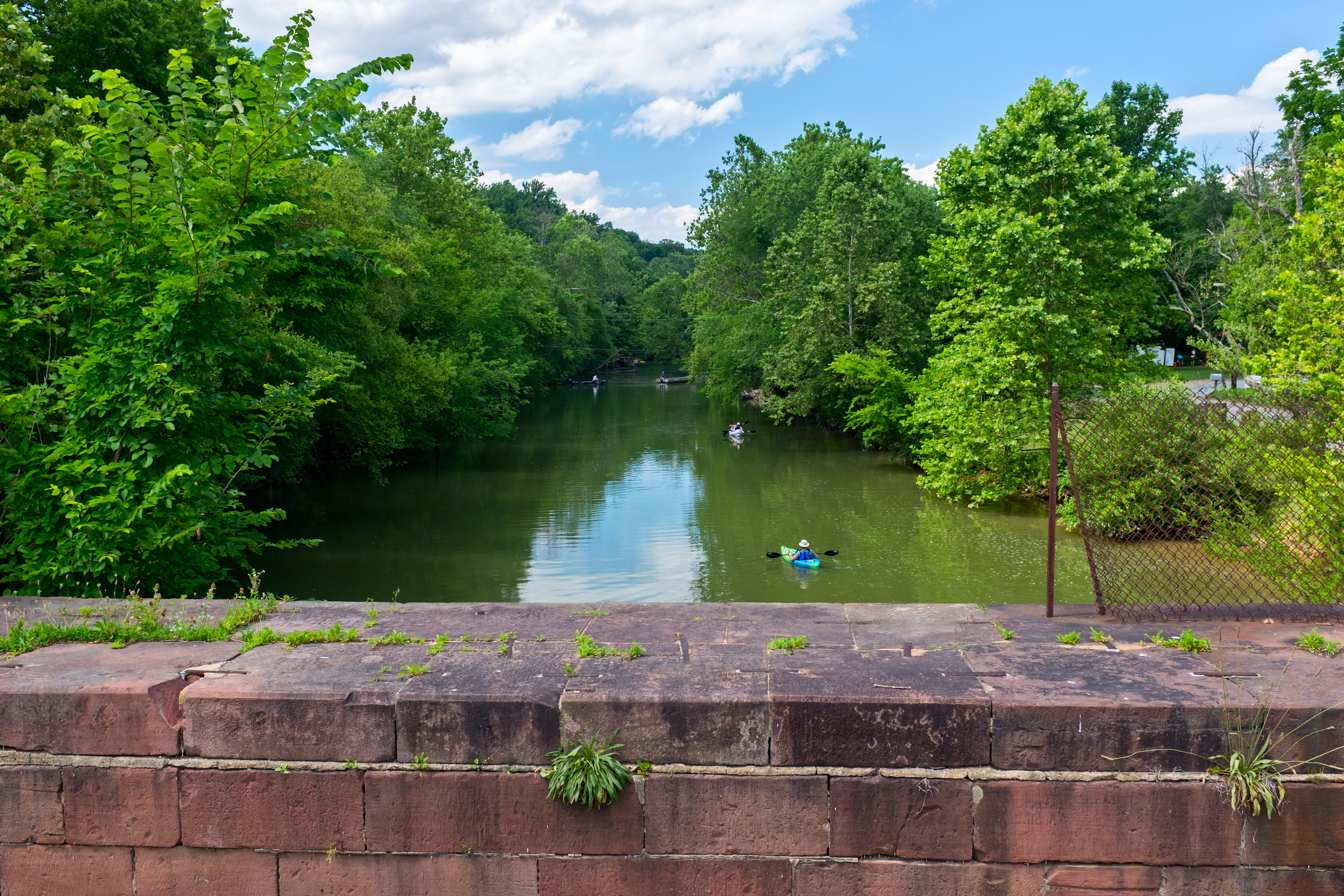
Seneca Creek in 2016, as seen looking north from the walkway on the aqueduct

Seneca was the location of the Mills Cross Array, once the world's largest radio telescope which, in 1955, was used to make the first observations of radio waves emitted from a planet. In this case, the planet was Jupiter, and the discovery led to the growth of a new field of radio astronomy. The Seneca Mill, a gristmill also known as the Darby Mill and later the Tchiffely Mill, was located on the west side of Seneca Creek about 0.5 miles north of River Road. The mill burned around 1956 and the ruins were destroyed when River Road was widened in the 1960s.

In 2021, the radio telescope is gone and the site is now part of the McKee-Beshers Wildlife Management Area. A historical marker commemorating the discovery is located on River Road at the management area's parking lot. All that remains of Seneca are a few homes, the schoolhouse as a museum, the store, and ruins of the stone-cutting mill and quarry. The community is still listed by the United States Geological Survey as a populated place.

== Geography ==
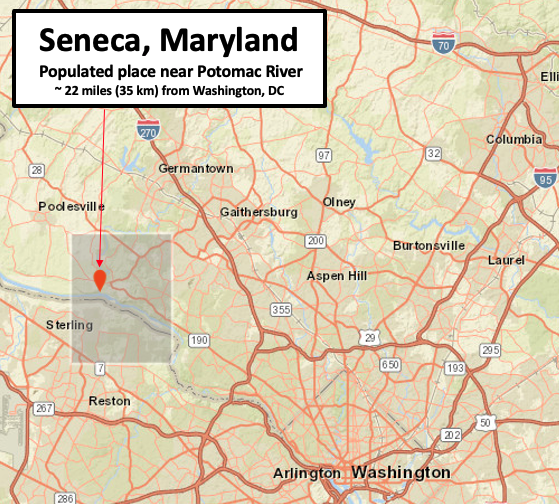
Seneca, Maryland, and surrounding area

Seneca is a populated place that is not a census-designated or incorporated place having an official federally recognized name. Previous names for the community are Newport and possibly Middlebrook Mills. Seneca is located in Montgomery County, Maryland. The USGS defines a populated place as a place or area with clustered or scattered buildings and a permanent human population (city, settlement, town, village). A populated place is usually not incorporated and by definition has no legal boundaries. However, a populated place may have a corresponding "civil" record, the legal boundaries of which may or may not coincide with the perceived populated place.

Seneca is located close to the intersection of River Road (Maryland Route 190), Seneca Road (Maryland route 112), and Rileys Lock Road, east of Great Seneca Creek and north of the Potomac River. The C&O Canal runs along the river, and Riley's Lock is the closest canal lock. The southern portion of Seneca Creek State Park is nearby, as is the Bretton Woods Golf Course. The United States Geological Survey (USGS) lists the community's elevation as 187 feet (57 meters).

=== Climate ===
Climate data for Poolesville, MD (same zip code as Seneca)
Month	Jan	Feb	Mar	Apr	May	Jun	Jul	Aug	Sep	Oct	Nov	Dec	Year
Mean daily maximum °F (°C)	39 (4)	44 (7)	53 (12)	65 (18)	75 (24)	83 (28)	89 (32)	87 (31)	79 (26)	67 (19)	54 (12)	45 (7)	65 (18)
Mean daily minimum °F (°C)	27 (−3)	29 (−2)	36 (2)	46 (8)	56 (13)	64 (18)	69 (21)	67 (19)	61 (16)	51 (11)	39 (4)	33 (1)	48 (9)
Average precipitation inches (mm)	3.7 (94)	4.4 (110)	4.6 (120)	4.4 (110)	5.9 (150)	5.0 (130)	5.4 (140)	5.4 (140)	5.0 (130)	5.6 (140)	3.6 (91)	4.8 (120)	57.8 (1,475)
Source: WeatherWX

== Demographics ==
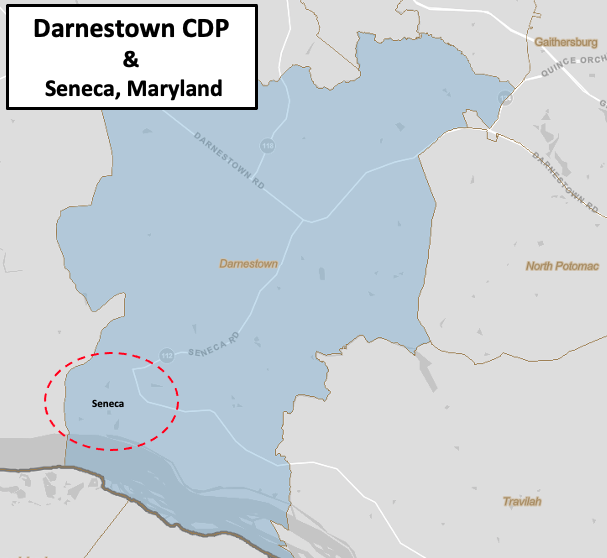
Darnestown CDP and Seneca

Seneca is part of the Darnestown census-designated place (CDP), an unincorporated area in Montgomery County, Maryland. The CDP is 17.70 square miles (45.8 km^{2}) with the Potomac River as its southern border and the Muddy Branch as much of its eastern border. Seneca Creek borders portions of its north and west sides. As of the 2010 U.S. census, the Darnestown CDP population was 6,802—and Seneca's population is a small subset of the CDP total. Total land area for the CDP was 16.39 square miles (42.4 km^{2}) out of a total area of 17.70 square miles (45.8 km^{2}). The population density for the CDP was 415.0 inhabitants per square mile (160.2/km^{2}). The CDP had 2,275 housing units at an average density of 138.8 units per square mile (53.6 units/km^{2}). These densities were much lower than county seat Rockville, where the District 4 portion had a population density of 4,403.3 inhabitants per square mile (1,700.1/km^{2}) and a housing density of 1,779.3 units per square mile (687.0 units/km^{2}).

== Government ==
Citizens of Seneca are part of District 1 of the Montgomery County Council. The county council has representatives from each of five districts plus four at-large members. All members are elected at once and serve four-year terms.

== Infrastructure ==
=== Transportation ===
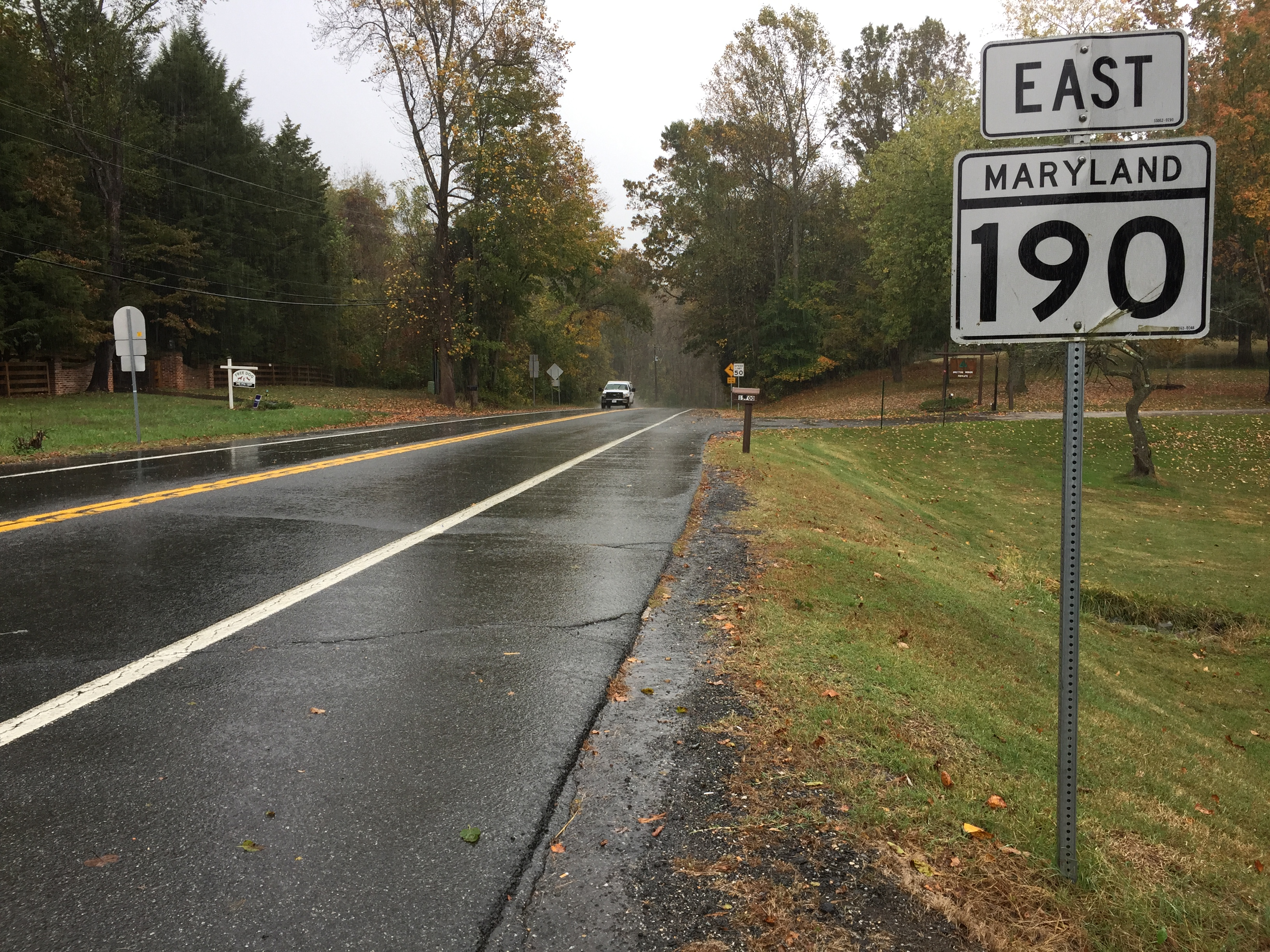
River Road at Seneca Road in 2016

Seneca's major roads are River Road (Maryland Route 190) and Seneca Road (Maryland Route 112). Three Interstate Highways are reasonably close. Maryland's Interstate 270 is a major north–south Interstate Highway for Montgomery County that connects with Washington's Capital Beltway (a.k.a. Interstate 495). Interstate 95 is a major north–south highway for the nation's east coast. Portions of the Washington Metropolitan Area Transit Authority's Metrorail system are located in Montgomery County, and Red Line stations on the west side of the county are closest to Seneca. Among those west side Metro stations with ample parking lots is the Grosvenor-Strathmore station.

=== Utilities ===
Seneca's electric power is provided by Pepco (Potomac Electric Power Company), which serves much of Montgomery County, portions of Prince George's County, and all of the District of Columbia. Washington Gas provides natural gas service to residents and businesses. The Shady Grove Processing Facility and Transfer Station, a county waste collection facility located in Rockville, is available for drop off of garbage, recycling, and yard debris.

=== Healthcare ===
The nearest general hospital is the Adventist HealthCare Shady Grove Medical Center in Rockville. This medical facility has a five-star rating from the Centers for Medicare & Medicaid Services. Adventist Health Care has multiple satellite locations throughout the county.

== Education ==
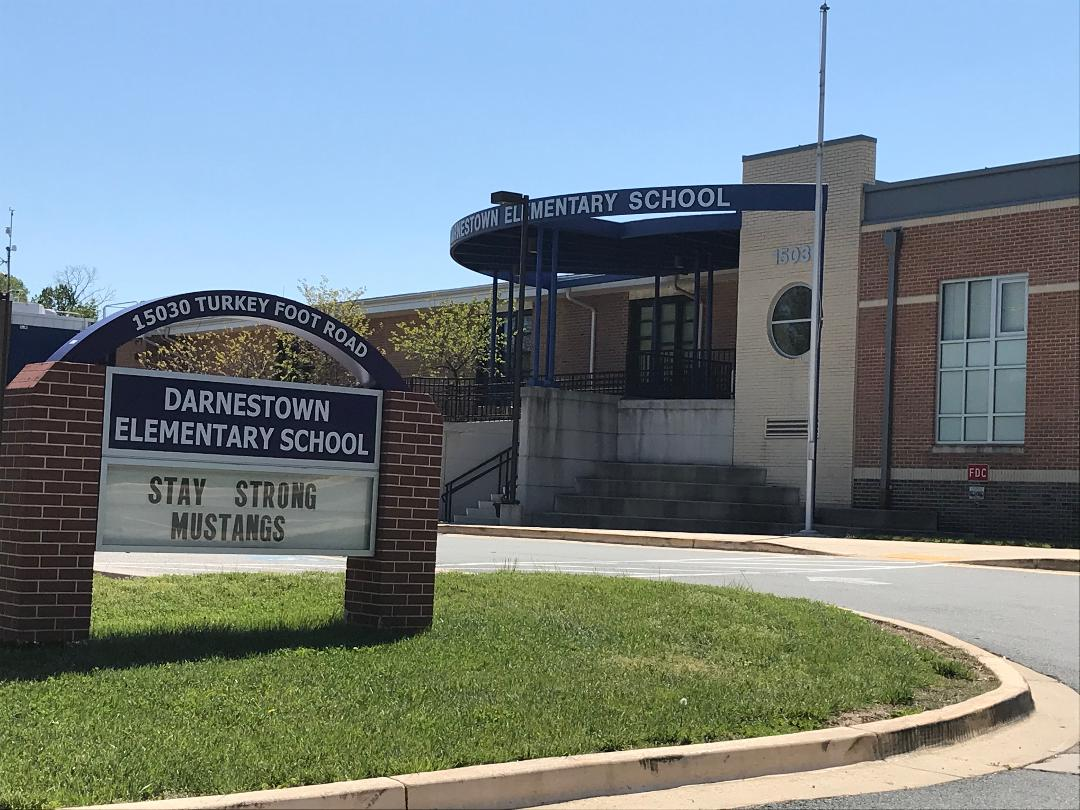
Darnestown Elementary School in 2020

Seneca is served by Montgomery County Public Schools. Those that live on, or east of, Rileys Lock Road attend Darnestown Elementary, Lakelands Park Middle School, and Northwest High School. Northwest High School is located in Germantown. Those that live west of Seneca Creek attend Poolesville elementary, middle, and high schools. Private schools in the area include Butler Montessori, Mary of Nazareth Catholic School, and Seneca Academy. Bullis School, which serves kindergarten through high school, is located slightly further away on a 102-acre campus in Potomac, Maryland.

=== Higher education ===
Montgomery College has a Germantown campus known as the Pinkney Innovation Complex for Science and Technology. It also has a campus in Rockville and a training center in Gaithersburg. The Universities at Shady Grove is located within North Potomac and offers select degree programs from nine public Maryland universities. Instead of being a university itself, this campus partners with other universities and offers courses for 80 upper-level undergraduate, graduate degree, and certificate programs. The participating universities handle admissions. Johns Hopkins University has a campus in Rockville near the Universities at Shady Grove.

=== Public library ===
Two libraries, part of the Montgomery County Public Library system, are located less than 10 miles (16 km) from Seneca. Poolesville Library, also known as Maggie Nightingale Library, is northwest of Seneca in Poolesville. Potomac Library, constructed in 1985 by the county, is located east of Seneca in Potomac. Priddy Library is part of the University of Maryland Libraries system and is located at the Universities at Shady Grove in North Potomac. The Priddy Library opened in 2007 and is available to the public.

== Culture ==
=== Arts ===
The Seneca Schoolhouse Museum provides tours to schoolchildren so that they can experience a typical school day as it would have been on March 13, 1880. Glenstone Modern Art Museum is about six miles east of Seneca near the intersection of Travilah Road and Glen Road. The Strathmore Music and Arts Center in North Bethesda has a concert hall and art exhibits.

=== Recreation ===
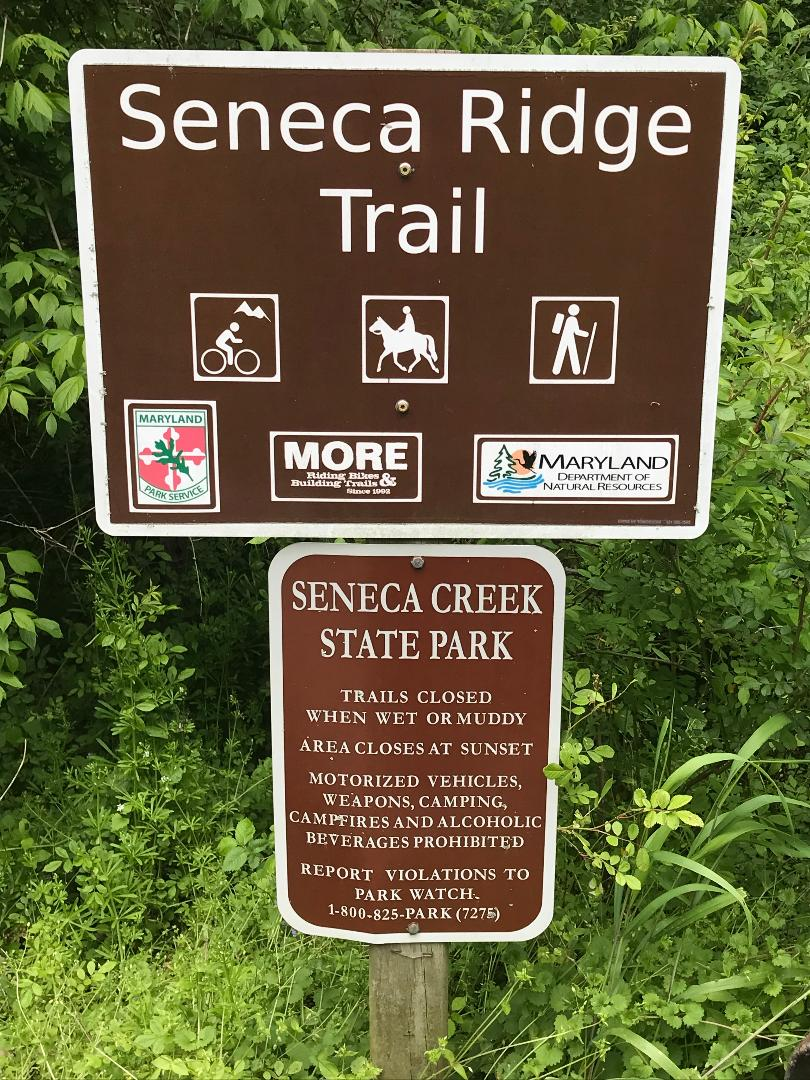
Seneca Creek State Park near Black Rock Mill

Seneca Creek State Park is an irregular-shaped park of 6,300 acres (2,500 ha) that follows Seneca Creek for 14 miles (23 km) to the Potomac River. The park has 50 miles (80 km) of trails for hiking, horseback riding and biking. Riley's Lock and Violette's Lock are in the Chesapeake and Ohio Canal National Historical Park, as is the nearby Pennyfield Lock. These locks are used by kayakers, bikers, and hikers, and are also good places to observe wildlife. The 40–acre (16 ha) Dierssen Waterfowl Sanctuary is located at towpath marker 20.0 between Violette's Lock and the Pennyfield Lock. The McKee-Beshers Wildlife Management Area is located on River Road west of Seneca in Montgomery County, and borders the C&O National Park and Seneca Creek State Park. It is a 1,971 acres (798 ha) tract that provides habitat for deer, turkeys, squirrels, songbirds, and waterfowl.

On the Potomac River, the Seneca Landing Special Park has a boat landing near Riley's Lock. The 630-acre (250-hectare) Blockhouse Point Conservation Park, which has views of the Potomac River and ruins from the American Civil War, is also located along the Potomac River and C&O Canal. The Callithea Farm Special Park is a 91-acre (37 ha) horse farm. The Montgomery County Park System has over 200 miles (320 km) of hiking trails. Among those trails is the Muddy Branch Greenway Trail, which has a 9-mile (14 km) route between Darnestown Road and Blockhouse Point Conservation Park near the Potomac River.

== Notes ==
=== References ===
- Boyd, T. H. S. (1879). The History of Montgomery County, Maryland, From its Earliest Settlement in 1650 to 1879. Clarksburg, MD [Baltimore]: W.K. Boyle & Son. OCLC 79381943.
- Buglass, Ralph (2015). The Montgomery County Story (Teaching Yet Today: A Century of One- and Two-Room Schools) (PDF). Rockville, Maryland: Montgomery County Historical Society. Archived (PDF) from the original on April 7, 2020.
- Hopkins, Griffith Morgan (1879). Atlas of Fifteen Miles around Washington, Including the County of Montgomery, Maryland. Philadelphia, Pennsylvania: F. Bourquin. Archived from the original on July 9, 2021.
- Kelly, Clare Lise; Maryland-National Capital Park and Planning Commission (2011). Places from the Past: The Tradition of Gardez Bien in Montgomery County, Maryland - 10th Anniversary Edition (PDF). Silver Spring, Maryland: Maryland-National Capital Park and Planning Commission. ISBN 978-0-97156-070-3. OCLC 48177160. Archived (PDF) from the original on April 12, 2021.
- Peck, Garrett (March 1, 2014). "Bull Run Culvert and Retaining Wall: Site of a Stonecutting Mill?" (PDF). Along the Towpath. Glen Echo, Maryland: Chesapeake & Ohio Canal Association. Archived (PDF) from the original on July 19, 2021.
- Peck, Garrett (2013). The Smithsonian Castle and the Seneca Quarry. Charleston, South Carolina: The History Press. ISBN 978-1-61423-857-7. OCLC 841413490.
- Scharf, J. Thomas (1882). History of western Maryland: Being a History of Frederick, Montgomery, Carroll, Washington, Allegany, and Garrett counties from the Earliest Period to the Present Day; Including Biographical Sketches of their Representative Men. Philadelphia, Pennsylvania: L.H. Everts. OCLC 2955029. Archived from the original on February 9, 2023.
- Scott, Robert N., ed. (1889). The War of the Rebellion : A Compilation of the Official Records of the Union and Confederate Armies, Series I – Volume XXVII Part I. Washington: Government Printing Office. OCLC 12241509. Archived from the original on February 9, 2023.
- United States Census Bureau (2012). Maryland: 2010 - Population and Housing Unit Counts (PDF). Washington, DC: U.S. Government Printing Office. Archived from the original (PDF) on March 7, 2021.
- United States Department of Transportation; Maryland Department of Transportation (2002). Multi-Modal Corridor Study, Frederick and Montgomery Counties, Maryland - Draft Environmental Impact Statement and Section 4(f) Evaluation Volume 2 of 2. Baltimore, MD: Maryland Department of Transportation. OCLC 49960675. Archived from the original on February 9, 2023.
- Welles, Judith (2019). Potomac. Charleston, South Carolina: Arcadia Publishing. ISBN 978-1-46710-436-4. OCLC 1111392250.
- Zdravkovska, Nevenka (2011). Academic Branch Libraries in Changing Times. Oxford, U.K.: Chandos Pub. ISBN 978-1-78063-270-4. OCLC 1047817835.
