= Seneca Quarry =

- U.S. National Register of Historic Places
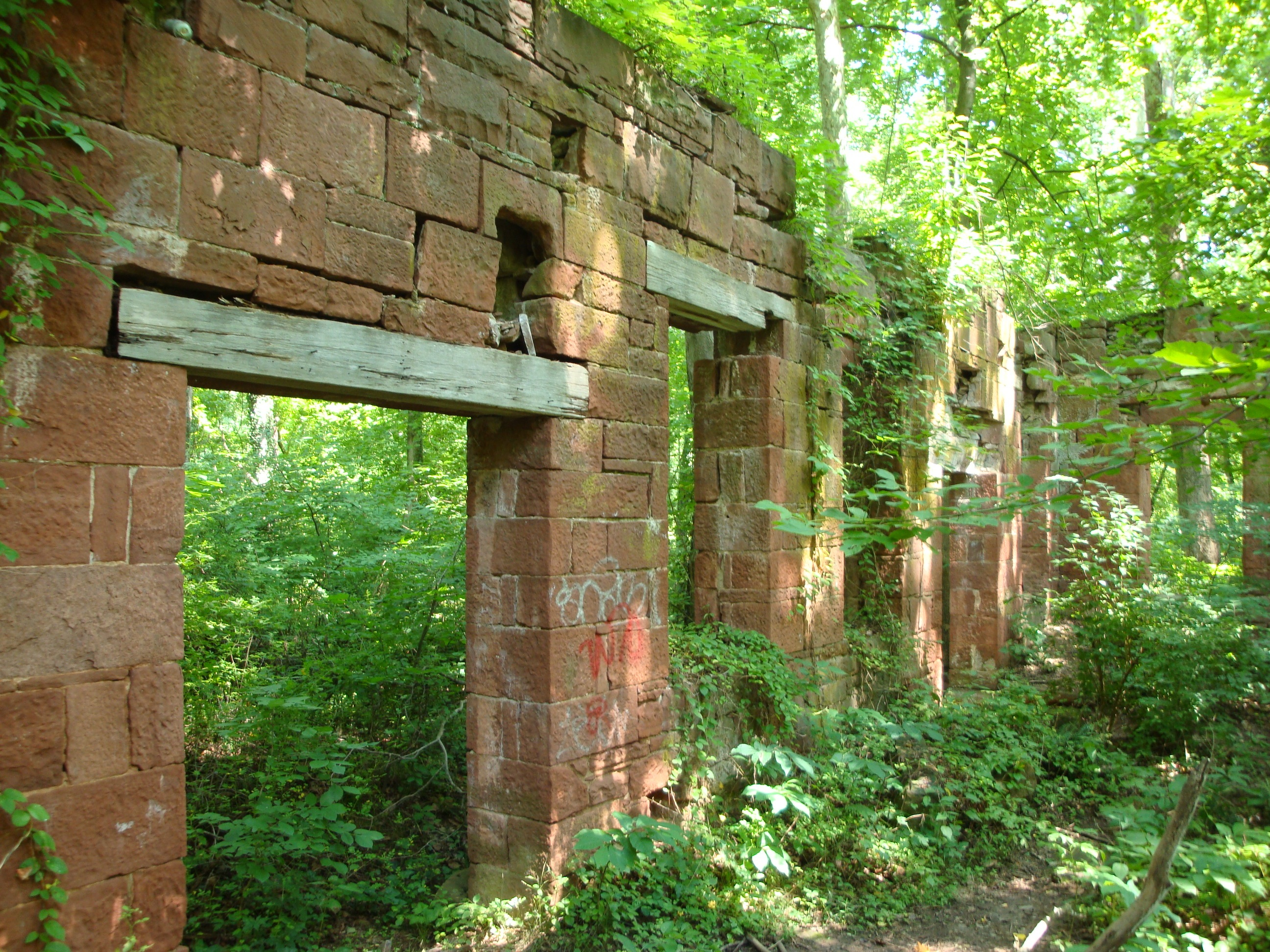
- Completed in 1868, the Seneca stone cutting mill cut the stone for hundreds of buildings in the Baltimore and Washington area before the Seneca quarry closed in 1901

- Location within Maryland Location within the United States
- Location: Tschiffeley Mill Road, Seneca, Maryland
- Coordinates: 39°4′8″N 77°20′45″W
- Area: 91.2 acres (36.9 ha)
- Built: c. 1780
- NRHP reference No.: 73000224
- Added to NRHP: April 24, 1973

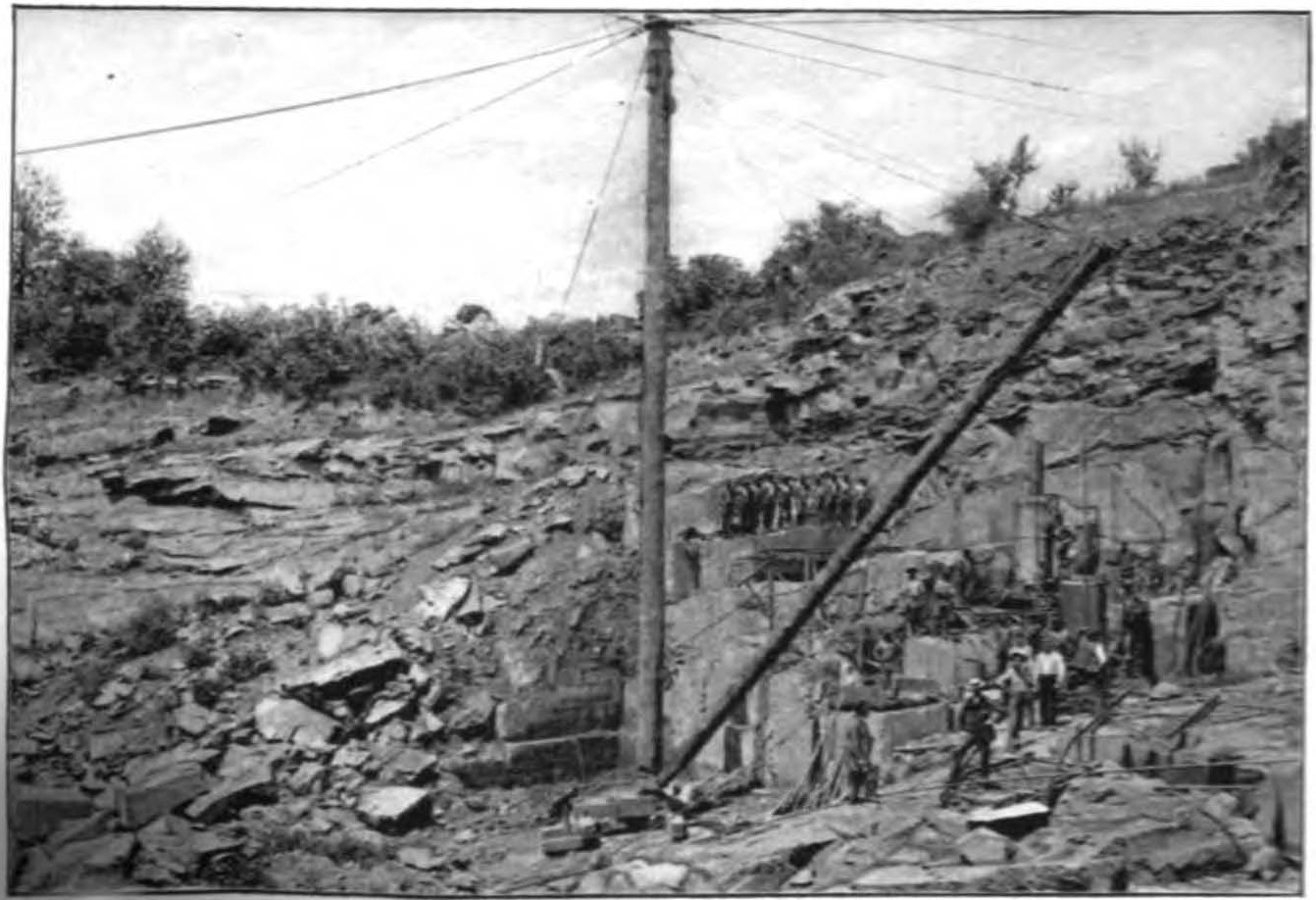
Historical photo of the quarry c. 1898

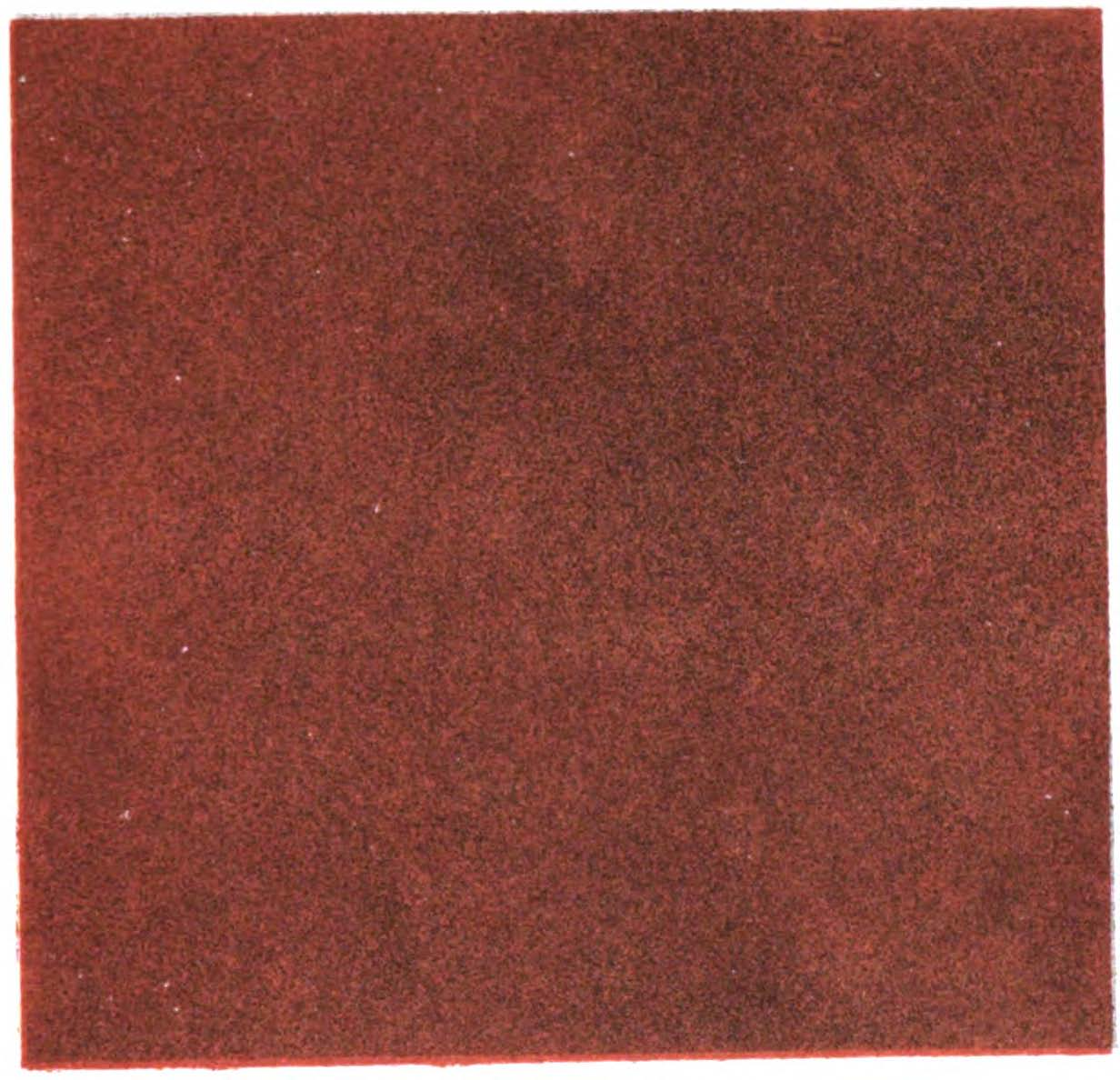
Polished slab of the red sandstone, about 10.7 cm across

Seneca Quarry is a historic site located at Seneca, Montgomery County, Maryland. It is located along the Chesapeake and Ohio Canal on the north bank of the Potomac River, just west of Seneca Creek. The quarry was the source of stone for two Potomac River canals: the Patowmack Canal (opened in 1802, and officially known as the Great Falls Skirting Canal) on the Virginia side of Great Falls; and the C&O Canal, having supplied red sandstone for the latter for locks 9, 11, 15 - 27, and 30, the accompanying lock houses, and Aqueduct No. 1, better known as Seneca Aqueduct, constructed from 1828 to 1833.

Seneca red sandstone, also known as redstone, formed during the Late Triassic age, 230 to 210 million years ago. The current geological name is Poolesville Member of Manassas Sandstone. Iron oxide gives the sandstone its rust color. It was prized for its ease of cutting, durability and bright color.

The stone quarried here for the Smithsonian Castle was originally described as "lilac grey" in color when quarried, but turned rusty red as it weathered.

Numerous quarries operated on the one-mile stretch of the Potomac River west of Seneca Creek. The C&O Canal provided a way for the heavy sandstone to reach the Washington, D.C. market, and the quarry's success is attributed to the canal. The Peter family of Georgetown, which built Tudor Place, owned the quarry from 1781 until 1866. John P.C. Peter, a great-grandson of Martha Washington, made the quarry into a commercial success by utilizing the C&O and winning the bid to supply red sandstone for the Smithsonian Castle, constructed 1847-1855. Peter built the stonecutting mill, drawing power from the adjacent canal turning basin. He also built a miniature of Tudor Place near the quarry called Montevideo, now owned by the Kiplinger family.

Seneca Quarry provided the stone for hundreds of buildings around the Washington, DC area, including houses in the Dupont Circle and Adams Morgan area, the James Renwick Jr.-designed Trinity Episcopal Church (1849; demolished 1936), Luther Place Memorial Church (1873), and the D.C. Jail in the 1870s. Montgomery C. Meigs purchased the Government Quarry nearby for the Washington Aqueduct project in the 1850s, and that quarry provided stone for the parapet of the Union Arch Bridge, better known as the "Cabin John Bridge," the Washington Aqueduct Dam at Great Falls, McClellan Gate at Arlington National Cemetery, as well as the mile-long boundary wall that surrounds the cemetery.

After the American Civil War, the Seneca Sandstone Company purchased the quarry in 1866, expanding the stonecutting mill in 1868, but went bankrupt in 1876 after financial mismanagement, sometimes referred to as the "Seneca Stone Ring Scandal." It was closed for seven years. In 1883, the Potomac Red Sandstone Company reopened the quarry but only operated until 1889, when the Great Flood of 1889 knocked out the C&O Canal for two years. Baltimore quarry operator George Mann purchased the Seneca quarry in 1891 and operated it for the next decade. By 1901, quarrying operations had stopped as the quality of the rock diminished and Victorian architecture was no longer in vogue.

The Seneca Schoolhouse, a small one-room schoolhouse of red sandstone, was built in 1866 to educate the children of the stone cutters who worked at the quarry. Located in Poolesville, Maryland, it provides tours to schoolchildren so that they can experience a typical school day as it would have been on March 13, 1880.

Seneca Quarry is now overgrown with sycamore trees, tulip poplars, and dense brush such as wild rose, such that it is impenetrable much of the year. It is best visited in winter. The property includes ruins of the stonecutting mill, located at "the Junction of Seneca Creek and the C&O Canal, just NW of the aqueduct" and the restored quarry master's house, located within Seneca Creek State Park. The quarry proper, Seneca Aqueduct, and the quarry cemetery are all part of the Chesapeake and Ohio Canal National Historical Park. The quarry falls within the boundaries of the Seneca Historic District.

Seneca Quarry was listed on the National Register of Historic Places in 1973.
