= Seneca Aqueduct =

- U.S. Historic district – Contributing property
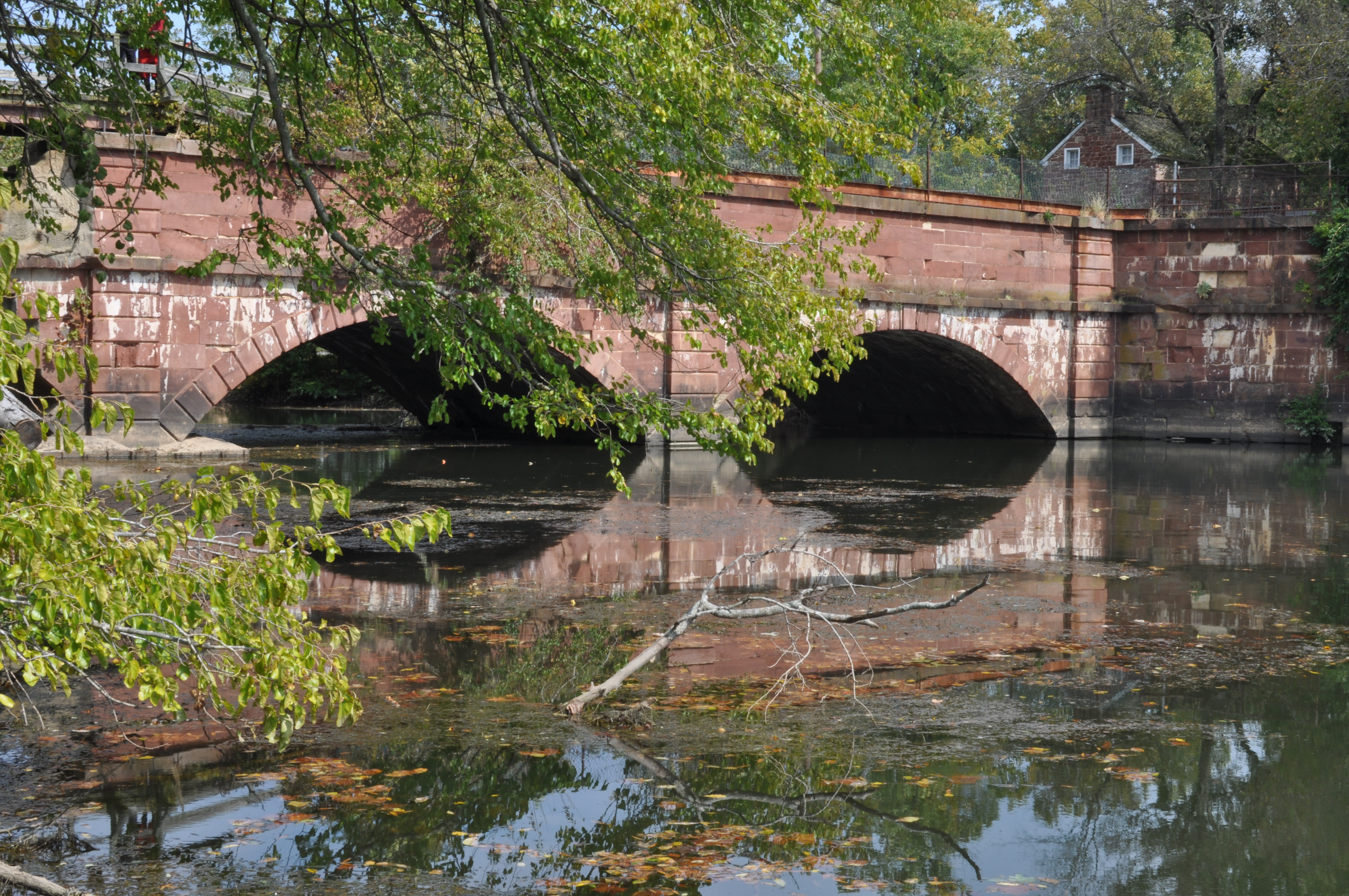
- Aqueduct, with Riley's Lockhouse at upper right.

- Location within Maryland Location within the United States
- Nearest city: Poolesville, Maryland
- Coordinates: 39°4′7.45″N 77°20′28.22″W
- Part of: Seneca Historic District (Poolesville, Maryland) (ID78001475)
- Added to NRHP: November 15, 1978

Seneca Aqueduct — or Aqueduct No. 1 — is a naviduct that carries the Chesapeake and Ohio Canal (C&O) over Seneca Creek in Montgomery County, Maryland. The C&O built eleven aqueducts along its 184.5 miles (296.9 km) length. Seneca Aqueduct is a unique structure, not only being the first built, but also the only red sandstone aqueduct on the C&O−and the only aqueduct that is also a lock (Lock 24, or Riley's Lock). It is located at the end of Riley's Lock Road in Seneca, Maryland.

== History ==
Seneca Aqueduct was built from 1829 to 1832 with three red sandstone arches quarried in the nearby Seneca Quarry, just a few hundred feet to the west. The initial stretch of the C&O Canal opened in 1830 up to Lock 23 and Inlet Lock 2, one lock downstream from the Seneca Aqueduct. The segment from Seneca Aqueduct to Harpers Ferry opened in 1833. This included a sizable turning basin, just west of the aqueduct, where canal boats could anchor or turn around. Next to the aqueduct and lock is the lock keeper's house, also made from Seneca red sandstone. Because of the canal, the nearby quarry operations, and additional mills on Seneca Creek, the town of Seneca was an active working class community.

In 1897, the steam packet boat Anna Wilson leaving the aqueduct, collided with a freight boat loaded with watermelons, and sank. There were no injuries to the passengers. Local residents had "a ball" fishing out the watermelons floating in the basin.

The canal closed in 1924 after ninety-six years in operation.

A major flood in September 1971 took out the westernmost of the three arches. The National Park Service has since shored up the aqueduct with steel beams.

Seneca Aqueduct is part of the C&O Canal National Historic Park and is administered by the National Park Service. The aqueduct is included in the Seneca Historic District in Montgomery County, Maryland.

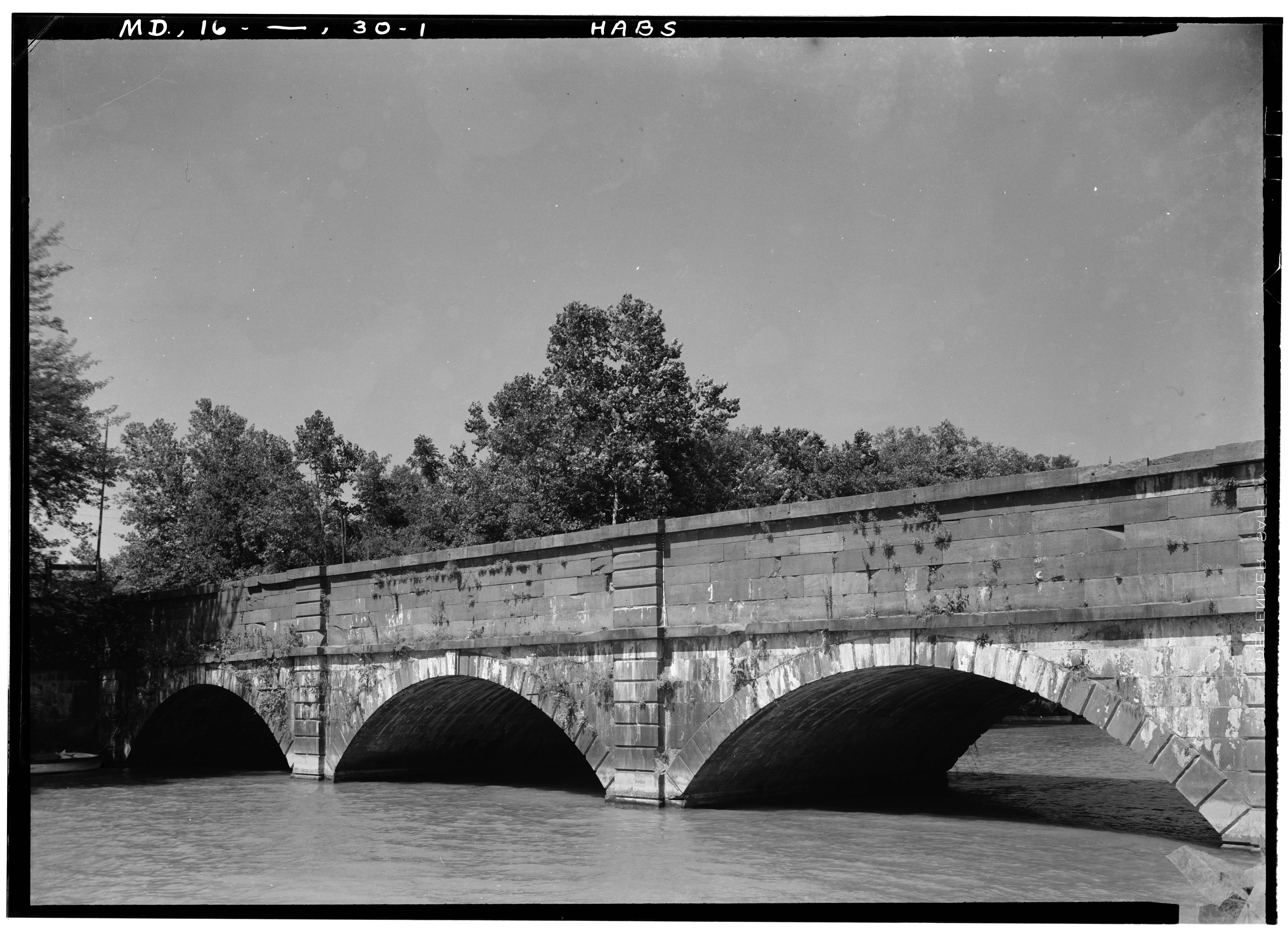
The Seneca Aqueduct in 1936, before collapse

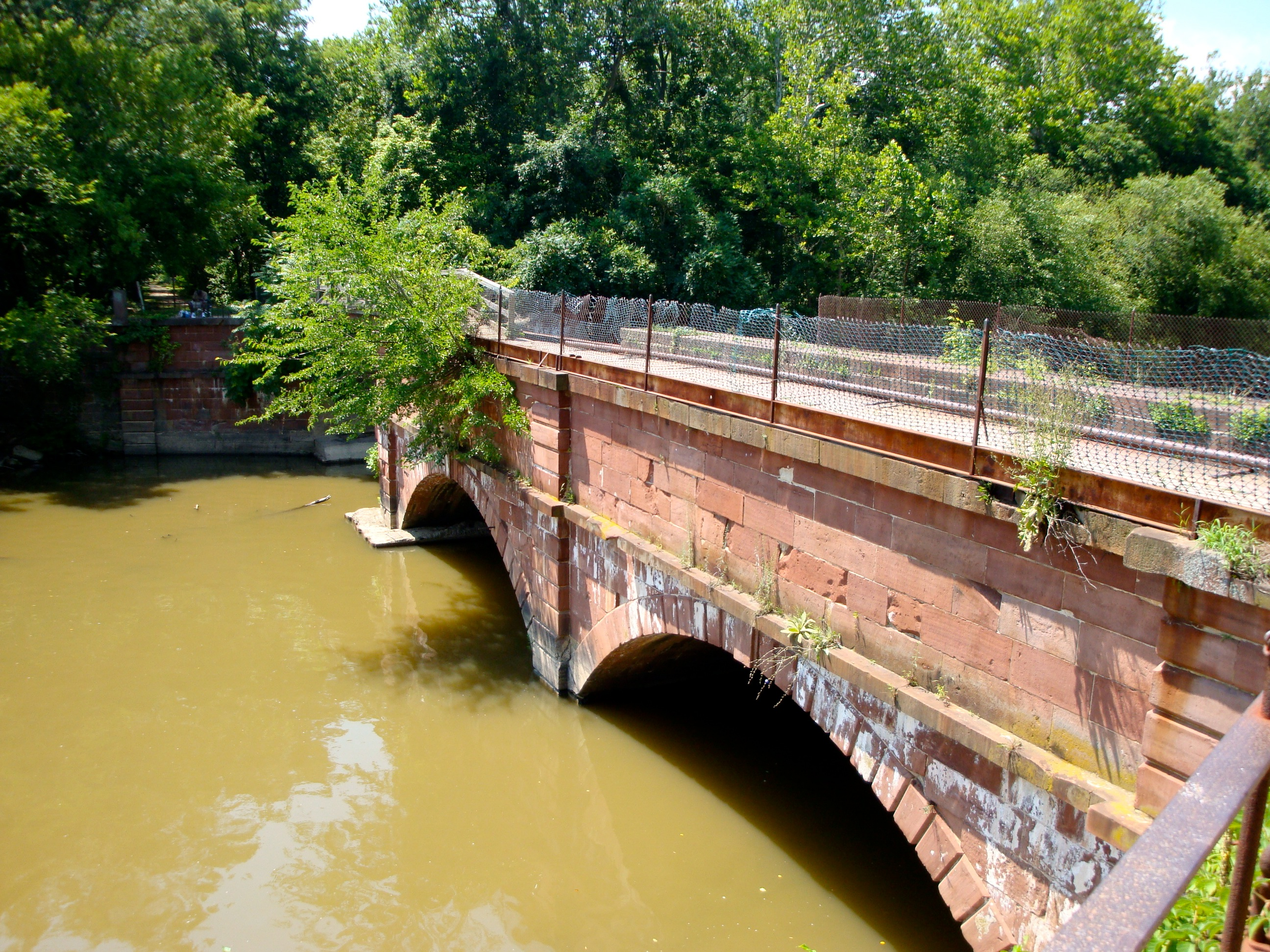
The Seneca Aqueduct today
