= Dierssen Wildlife Management Area =

Wildlife management area in Montgomery County, Maryland

- IUCN category V (protected landscape/seascape)
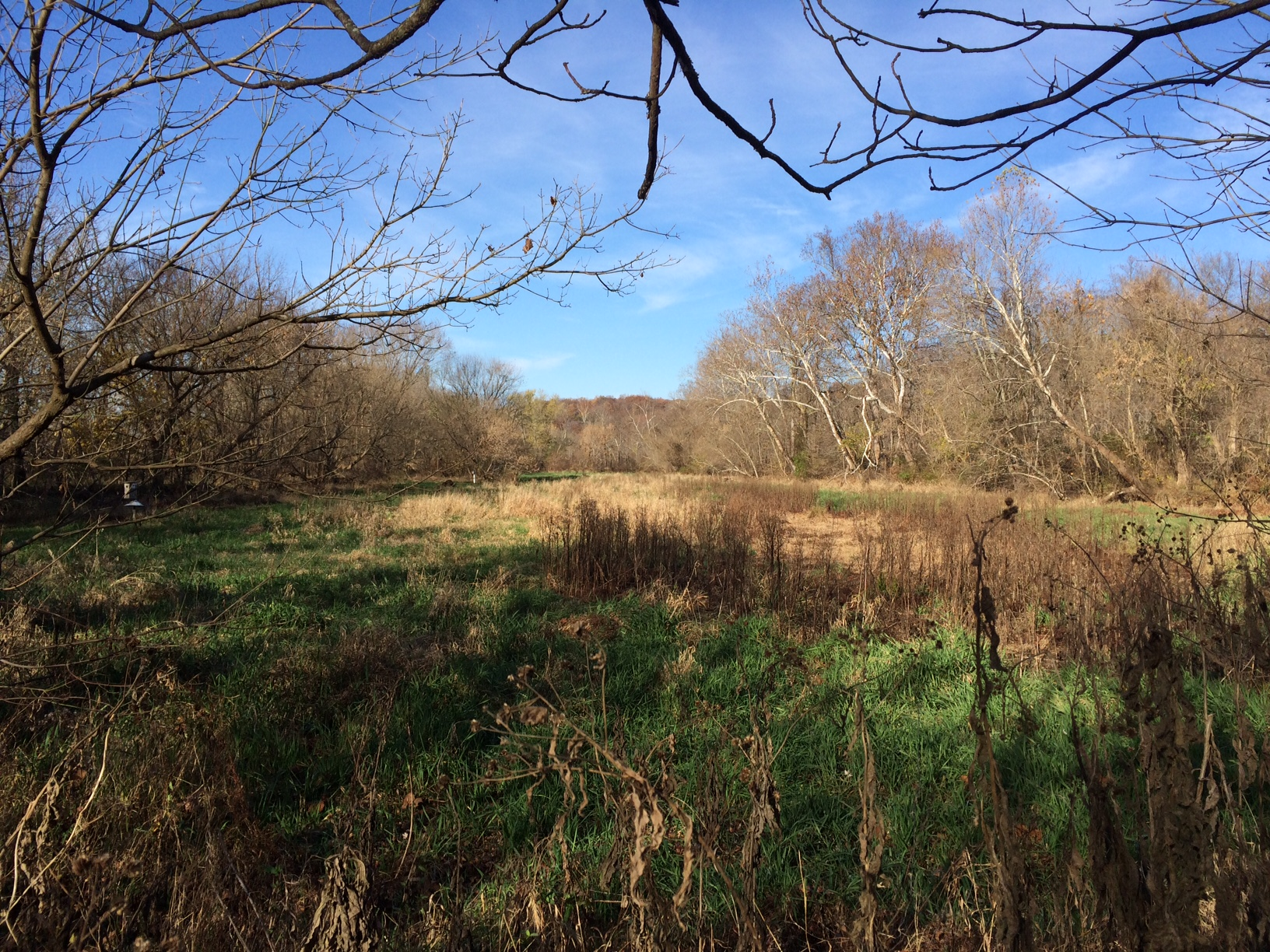
- Dierssen WMA, East Impoundment
- Interactive map of Dierssen Wildlife Management Area
- Location: Montgomery County, Maryland, U.S.
- Coordinates: 39.05836°N 77.30398°W
- Area: 40 acres (0.16 km^{2})
- Governing body: Maryland Department of Natural Resources

Dierssen Wildlife Management Area is a Wildlife Management Area (WMA) near Seneca in Montgomery County, Maryland.

The WMA covers a 40-acre (16 ha) tract of marshy woodland, with two man-made ponds ('impoundments') for wildlife, located between Chesapeake & Ohio Canal towpath (mileposts 20.08 to 20.90) and the Potomac River. The nearest access point is the Pennyfield Lock parking lot at MP 19.7.

Unlike most WMAs in Maryland, Dierrsen is a wildlife sanctuary - no hunting is allowed, but hiking and photography are encouraged. Because of the impoundments and location on the Potomac migration route, the tract is a well-known habitat for waterfowl, wading birds and songbirds. There are nesting boxes for wood ducks. Also present are white-tailed deer, gray and red fox, beaver, and wild turkeys. The site, donated as a waterfowl sanctuary, is named for Marshall Bidwell Dierssen.

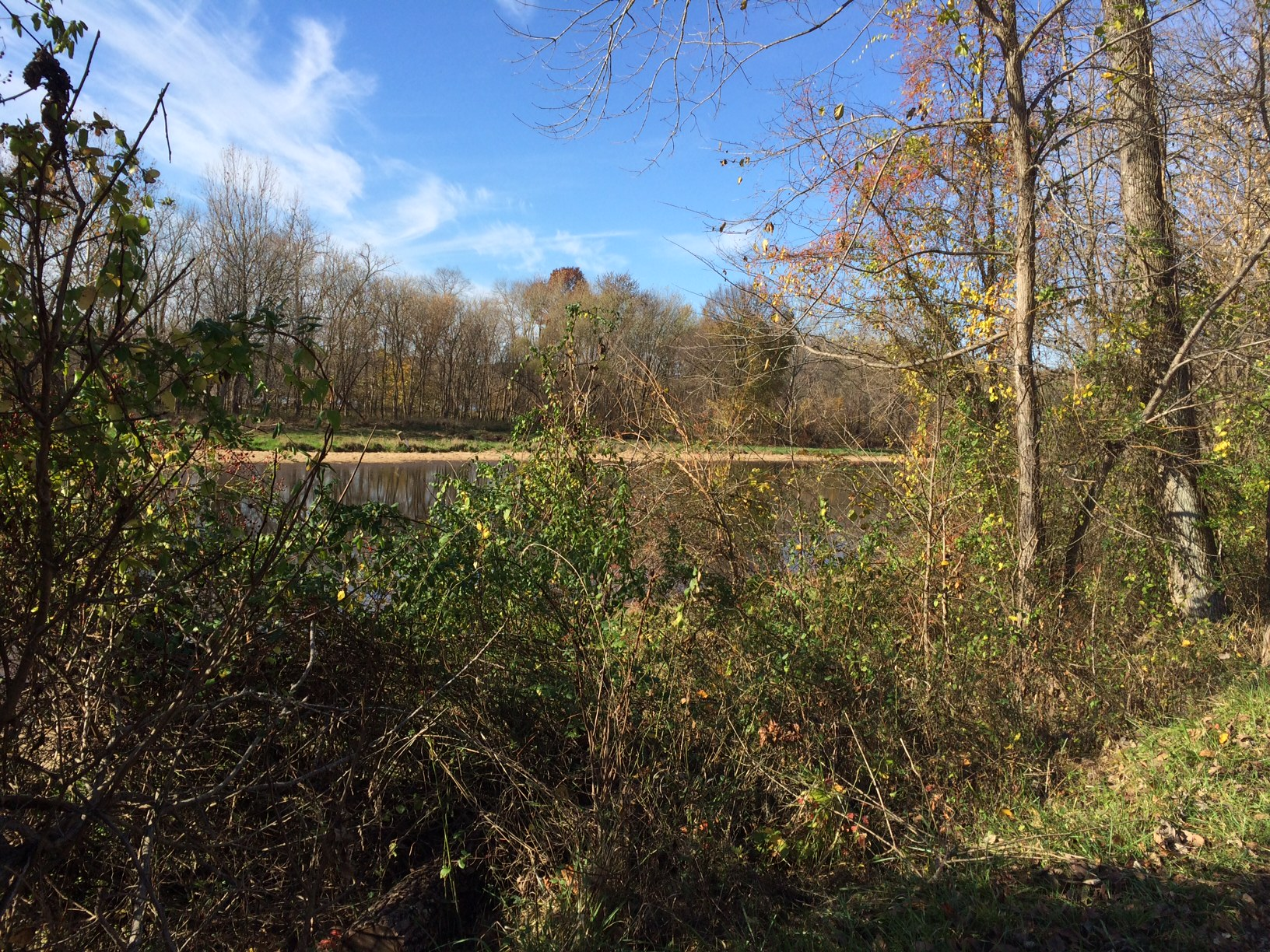
Dierssen West Impoundment
