= Seneca Creek State Park =

State park in Montgomery County, Maryland, United States

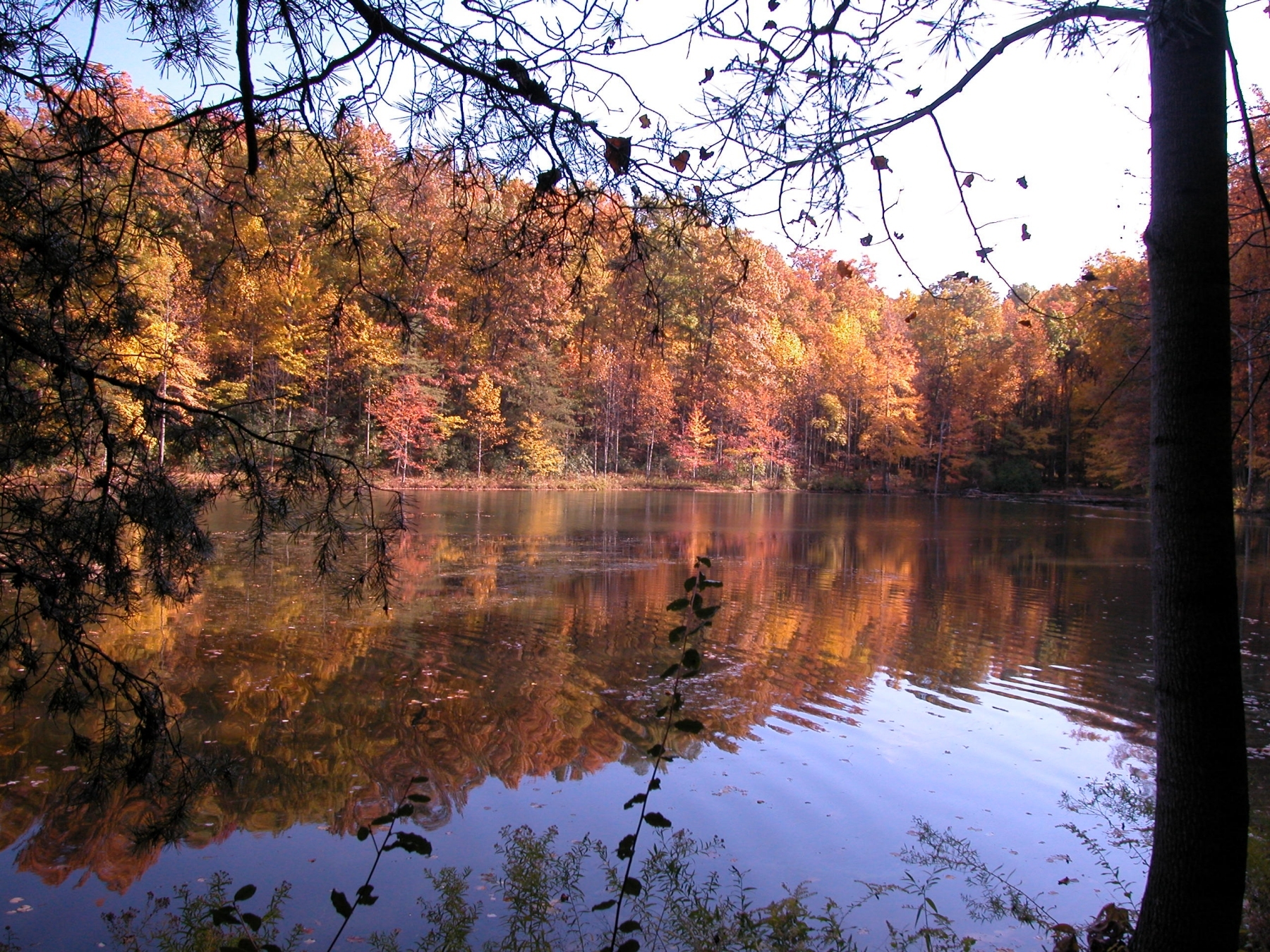
- Clopper Lake

- Location within Maryland
- Location: Montgomery County, Maryland, United States
- Nearest town: Gaithersburg, Maryland
- Coordinates: 39°08′32″N 77°15′04″W
- Area: 6,157 acres (2,492 ha)
- Elevation: 351 ft (107 m)
- Established: 1958
- Administrator: Maryland Department of Natural Resources
- Designation: Maryland state park
- Website: Official website

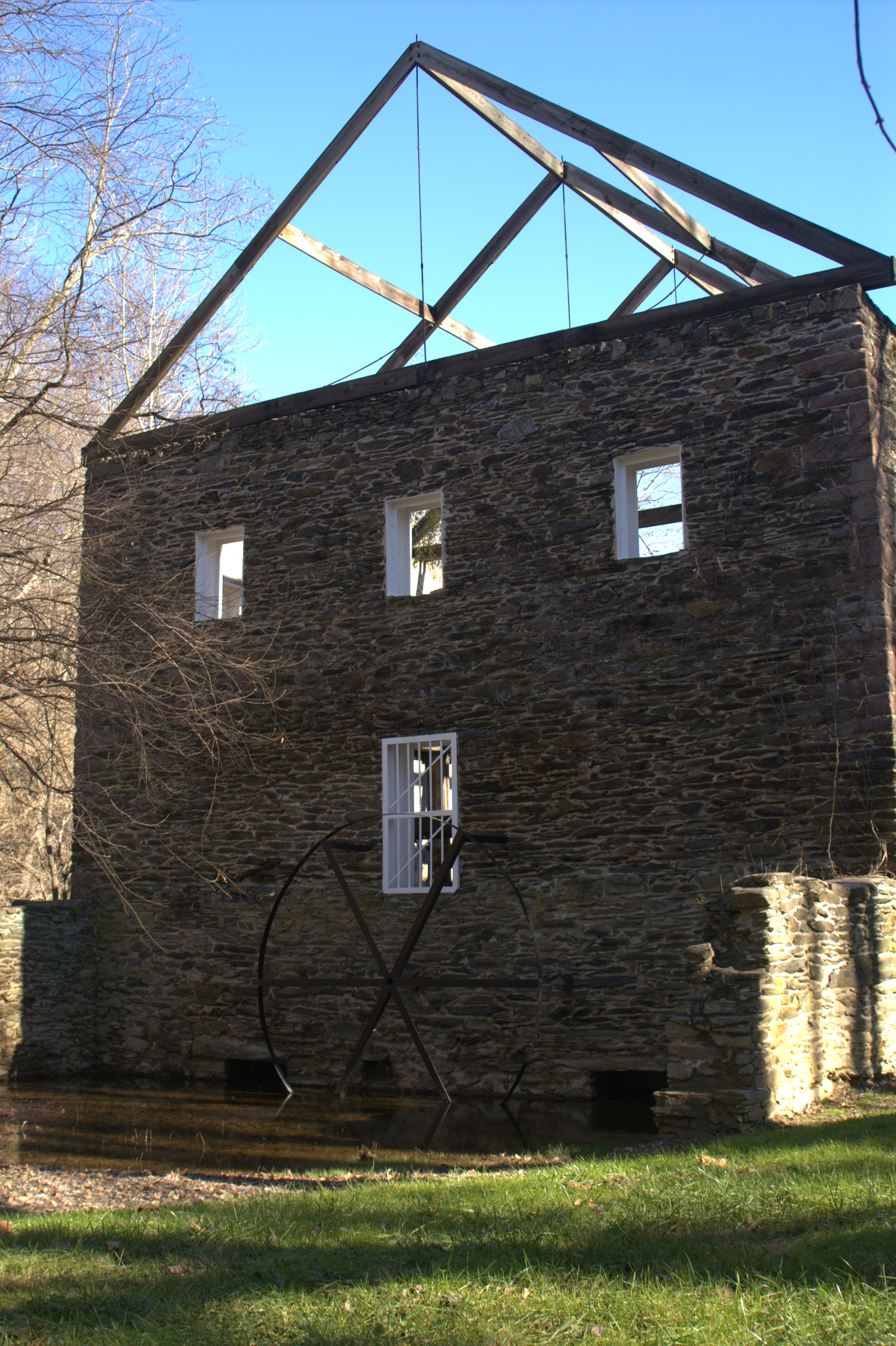
Remains of Black Rock Mill

Seneca Creek State Park is a Maryland state park encompassing more than 6,300 acres (2,500 ha) along 14 miles of Seneca Creek in its run to the Potomac River in Montgomery County, Maryland, United States. The park features facilities for boating and fishing as well as trails for hiking, cycling, and horseback riding. It is managed by the Maryland Department of Natural Resources.

== History ==
The park opened as Seneca State Park in 1958. The Maryland General Assembly authorized funds for land purchases in each year from 1965 to 1968. The park saw "Stage A" development when, in the 1966, the General Assembly authorized funds for camping and picnicking sites, roads, utilities, buildings, and other features. In 1975, Clopper Lake was created for recreational use and flood control by damming Long Draught Creek, a tributary of Seneca Creek.

== Activities and amenities ==
Clopper Lake

The developed portion of the state park centers on 90-acre (36 ha) Clopper Lake and the Clopper Lake Day Use Area (CLDUA) which is bounded by Clopper Road to the north, Longdraft Road to the east, Great Seneca Highway to the south, and Riffleford Road to the west in Gaithersburg. Clopper Lake averages a depth of 18 feet (5.5 m), has shallow enclaves, is stocked with largemouth bass, tiger muskie, channel catfish, sunfish, bluegill, and pumpkinseed sunfish, and allows boating.

Trails

The park contains 50 miles (80 km) of trails, some in the CLDUA, and 12 miles (19 km) in the Schaeffer Farm Trails Area. Trails are used for hiking, mountain biking, horseback riding, and cross-country skiing. The Lake Shore Trail loops around Clopper Lake. 16.5 miles (26.6 km) miles of the Seneca Creek Greenway Trail follows Great Seneca Creek within the park from Route 355 to the Potomac River. The Seneca Bluffs Trail is a 7.5 miles (12.1 km) natural surface trail between Black Rock Mill, Darnestown Road, Poole's General Store, and the C&O Canal. The Seneca Ridge Trail is a 5.8 miles (9.3 km) natural surface trail in the upland areas on the south bank of Seneca Creek. It provides a connection between Clopper Lake and Schaeffer Farm and is usable for hiking, trail running, and biking.

Kayaking

Sections of Seneca Creek can be travelled by kayak, especially south of Route 28, Darnestown Road, or further north during periods of high water. North of Route 28, it may be necessary to portage around trees down across the creek.

Other uses

The park has picnicking facilities, a tire playground, a 27-hole disc golf course, and a restored 19th-century cabin. Hunting is permitted in several areas of the park.

Events

Since 1995, the annual Winter Lights Festival has featured a drive-through holiday light show at year's end in the Clopper Lake Day Use Area. The park also offers visitors hayrides that showcase the local fauna. The highlight of the hayride is when the tour guide shines a flashlight into a particular glade and dozens of pairs of white-tailed deer eyes light up in response.

== Historic sites ==
The remains of Seneca Quarry, built in 1837, is off Tschiffely Mill Road just west of where Seneca Creek empties into the Potomac. The mill cut the red sandstone for the Smithsonian Castle. The restored quarry masters house stands above the quarry site. Both are part of the state park.

The partially restored Black Rock Mill has interpretive exhibits featuring a history of area floods. The Seneca Schoolhouse is a restored 19th-century schoolhouse which was built for the children of local quarry laborers. Parts of the park were once part of an estate owned by the Clopper family. The Woodlands area near the Clopper Lake Day Use Area commemorates the Clopper family with a self-guided trail that offers a look into life in the 19th century.

== In popular culture ==
The Blair Witch Project was partially filmed in the Seneca Creek State Park in October 1997, and the rock band O.A.R. referenced the park in the song "Black Rock" on their 1997 album The Wanderer.
