= Seneca Historic District (Poolesville, Maryland) =

Historic district in Maryland, United States

- U.S. National Register of Historic Places
- U.S. Historic district
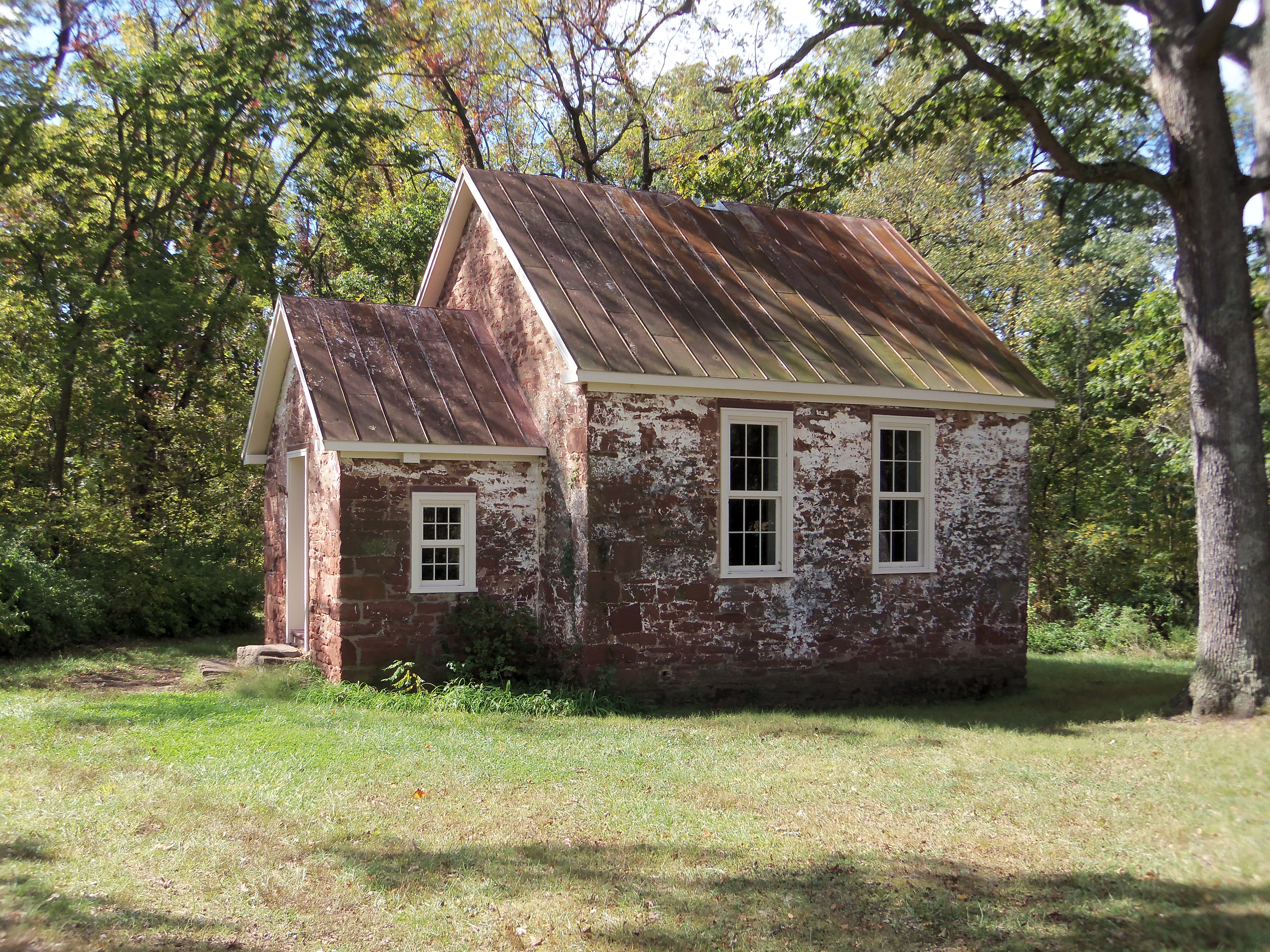
- Seneca Schoolhouse Museum

- Location within Maryland Location within the United States
- Location: Southeast of Poolesville, Poolesville, Maryland
- Coordinates: 39°5′28″N 77°20′48″W
- Area: 3,850 acres (1,560 ha)
- Built: 1802
- Architectural style: Italianate, Georgian, Federal
- NRHP reference No.: 78001475
- Added to NRHP: November 15, 1978

The Seneca Historic District is a national historic district located at Poolesville, Montgomery County, Maryland. The district comprises 3,850 acres (1,560 ha) of federal, state, and county parkland and farmland in which 15 historic buildings are situated. The Chesapeake and Ohio Canal, including Seneca Aqueduct (Aqueduct No. 1), Lock No. 24 (Riley's Lock), the adjacent lock house; as well as the Seneca Quarry and quarry masters house above the quarry also stand within the district and are also within Seneca Creek State Park. The 15 historic structures are surrounded by dependencies of various periods, in most cases dating from the period of the dwelling. There are slave quarters, smokehouses, springhouses, corn cribs, and tobacco barns.

It was listed on the National Register of Historic Places in 1978.
