= Seneca Creek (Potomac River tributary) =

Tributary of the Potomac River in Maryland, United States

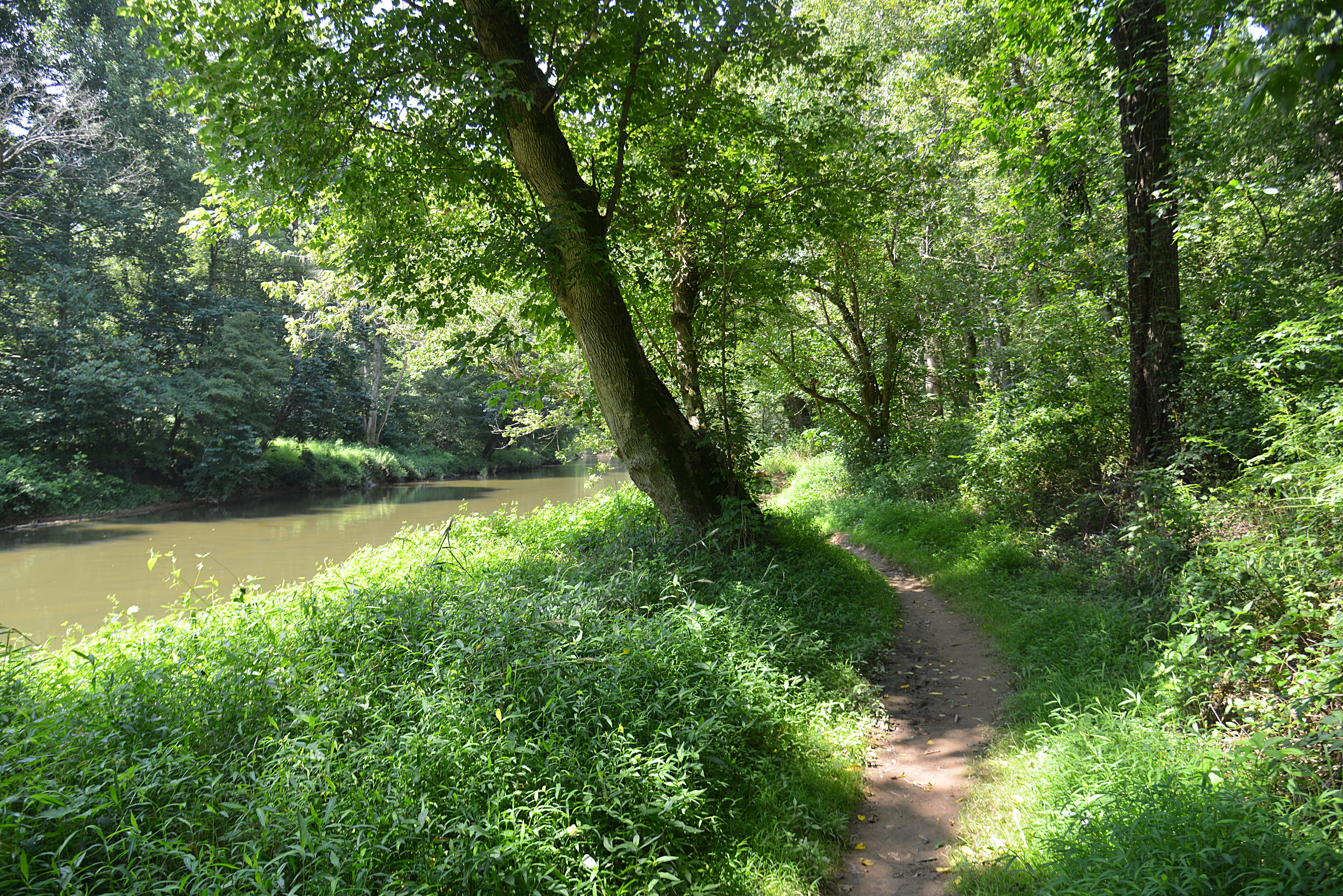
- Seneca Creek and the Seneca Creek Greenway trail near Berryville Road in Darnestown, MD

Location
- Country: United States
- State: Maryland
- Counties: Montgomery

Physical characteristics
- Source
  - location: Darnestown, MD
  - coordinates: 39°07′43″N 77°20′09″W
- Mouth: Potomac River
  - location: Seneca Aqueduct, Darnestown, MD
  - coordinates: 39°04′05″N 77°20′27″W
- Length: 5.8 mi (9.3 km)

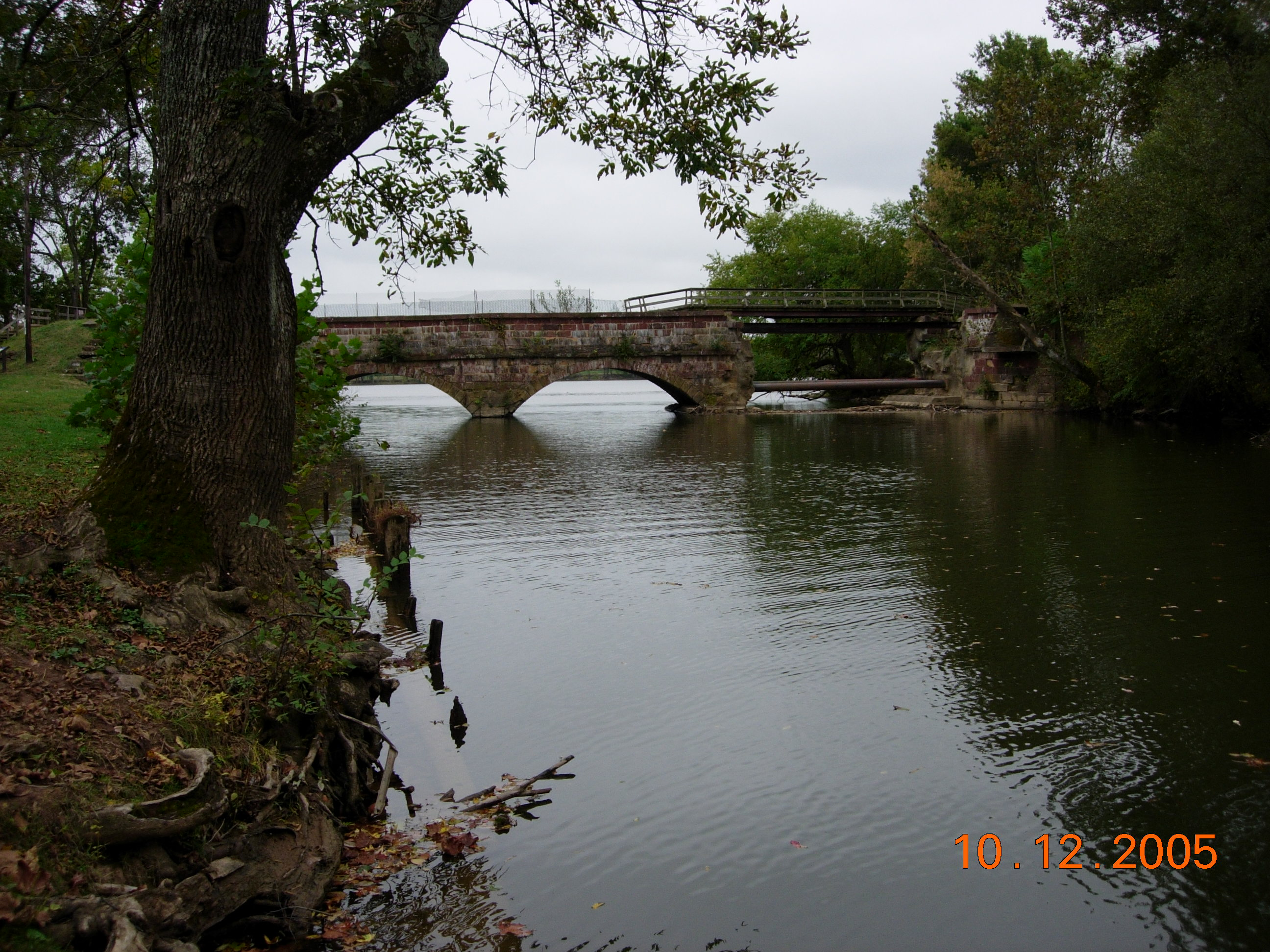
The Aqueduct at Riley's Lock

Seneca Creek is a 5.8-mile-long (9.3 km) stream in Montgomery County, Maryland, USA, roughly 16 miles (26 km) northwest of Washington, D.C. It drains into the Potomac River.

== Course ==
The creek begins with two main tributaries:

- Great Seneca Creek, 21.5 miles (34.6 km) long, begins in Damascus and flows south past Montgomery Village, Germantown, Gaithersburg and Seneca Creek State Park.
- Little Seneca Creek, 14.0 miles (22.5 km) long, rises in the Clarksburg area, flows south through Little Seneca Lake and Black Hill Regional Park, and the community of Boyds.

These tributaries converge near Darnestown. Another major tributary, Dry Seneca Creek, empties into Seneca Creek west of Darnestown. The creek continues south and passes under Seneca Aqueduct/Riley's Lock (Lock 24) of the Chesapeake and Ohio (C&O) Canal before it flows into the Potomac River. There is about a 600-foot (180 m) change in elevation from the stream's upper sources to its mouth at the Potomac. Seneca Creek has a watershed area of 121 square miles (310 km^{2}).

== Recreation ==
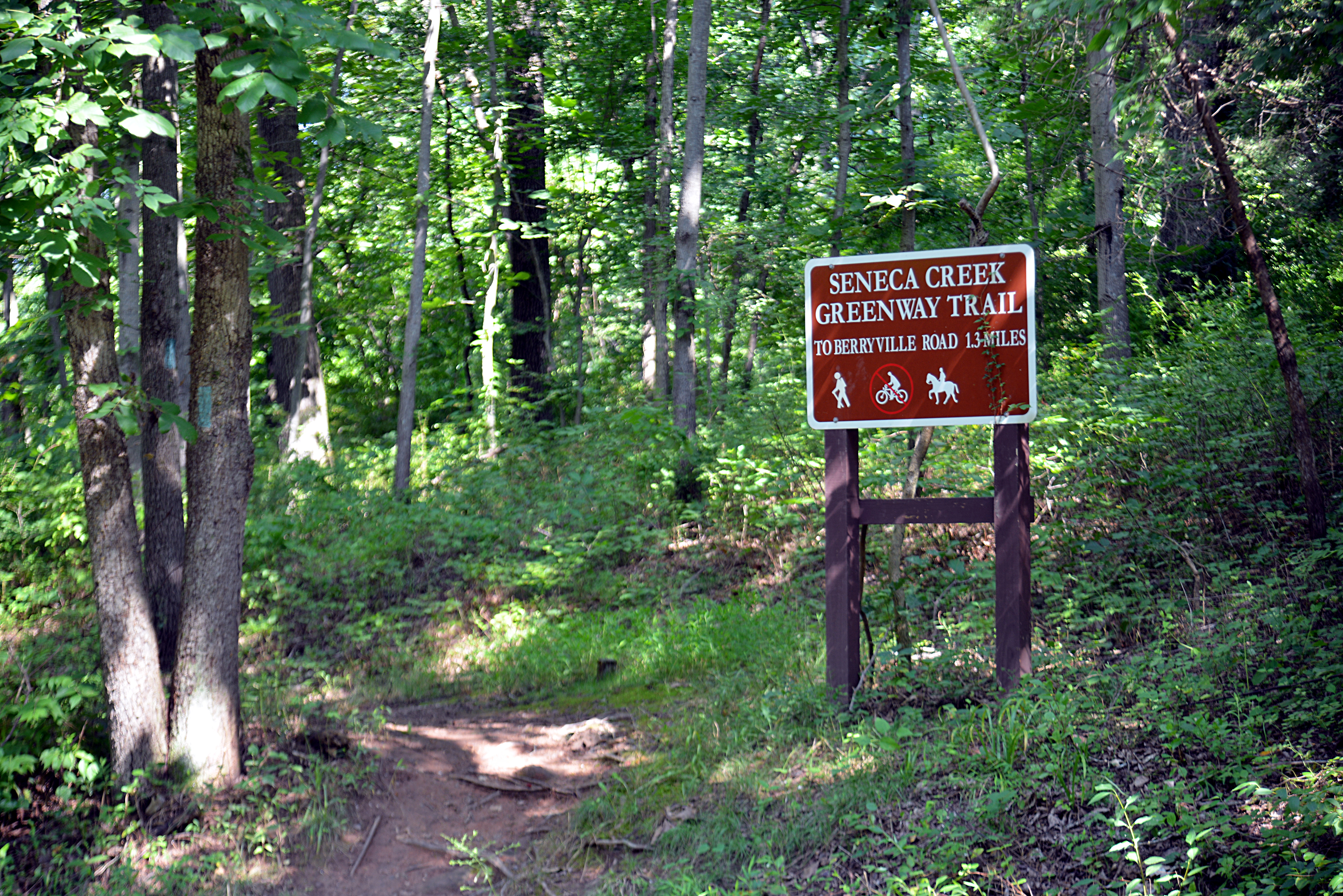
The entrance to Seneca Creek Greenway trail at Seneca Rd in Darnestown, MD.

Depending on conditions, parts of the creek are navigable by light watercraft, such as kayaks or canoes. Near Riley’s Lock there is a boat ramp into the creek which provides access to the Potomac River.

An area of about 6,300 acres (25 km^{2}) along 14.75 miles (23.74 km) of the creek has been set aside as Seneca Creek State Park. It has trails including the 16.5 miles (26.6 km) Seneca Creek Greenway Trail, the 10 miles (16 km) Schaeffer Farm Trail, and many shorter and easier trails. Parking and picnic areas are provided at various locations in the park. Long Draught Creek, a small tributary north of Gaithersburg has been dammed to form the 90 acres (0.36 km^{2}) Clopper Lake which is the centerpiece of the park's day use area. This area includes multiple picnic areas, a disc golf course, boat rentals for the lake, and restroom facilities.

== History ==
Just west of the creek's mouth is the Seneca Quarry, the quarry that provided the red sandstone for the Smithsonian Castle and locks 8 - 27 of the C&O Canal. The remains of the 1837 stone cutting mill are still intact, though unmarked; above the quarry is the restored quarry master's house. Both are within state park lands.

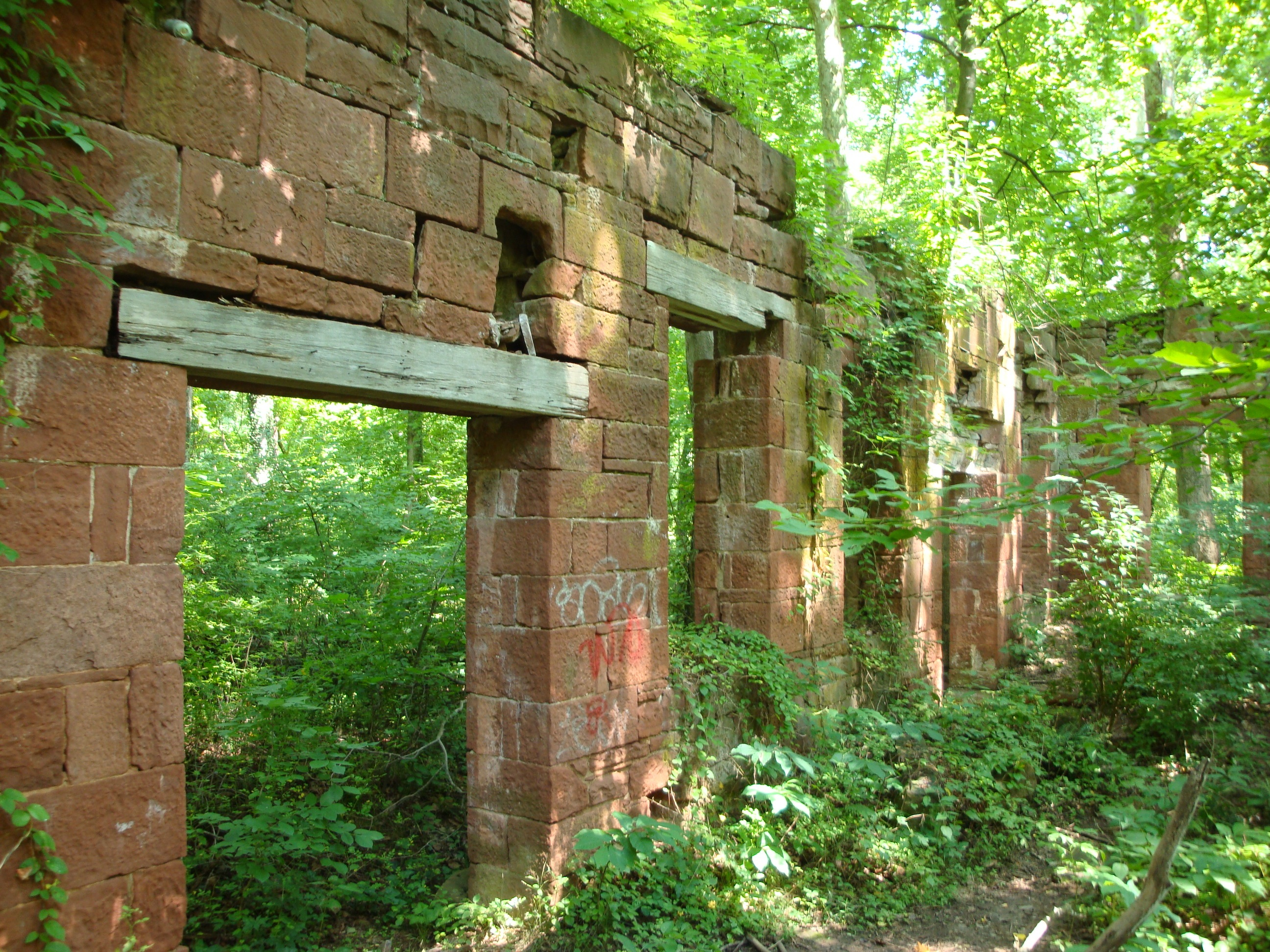
Built in 1837, the Seneca stone cutting mill cut the stone for the Smithsonian Castle

During the 1920s and 1930s Seneca was a popular vacation spot for people from lower Montgomery County and Washington who came for the cooler temperatures, boating, swimming, and fishing. There was a hotel near the canal and cottages lined the creek until they were washed away or destroyed by the several floods that have affected this area. Unfortunately Seneca has been the site of many drownings and boating accidents over the years. Today the area is a popular local recreation area.

== See also ==
- List of Maryland rivers
- Locks on the C&O Canal
