= Plummers Island =

Potomac River island in Montgomery County, Maryland, USA

Coordinates: 38°58′10″N 77°10′35″W

Plummers Island is a 12-acre Potomac River island in Montgomery County, Maryland, about nine miles upriver from Washington, D.C. The Washington Biologists' Field Club has called the island "the most thoroughly studied island in North America". The island is visible from the American Legion Memorial Bridge of the Capital Beltway, just downriver (east) of the bridge.

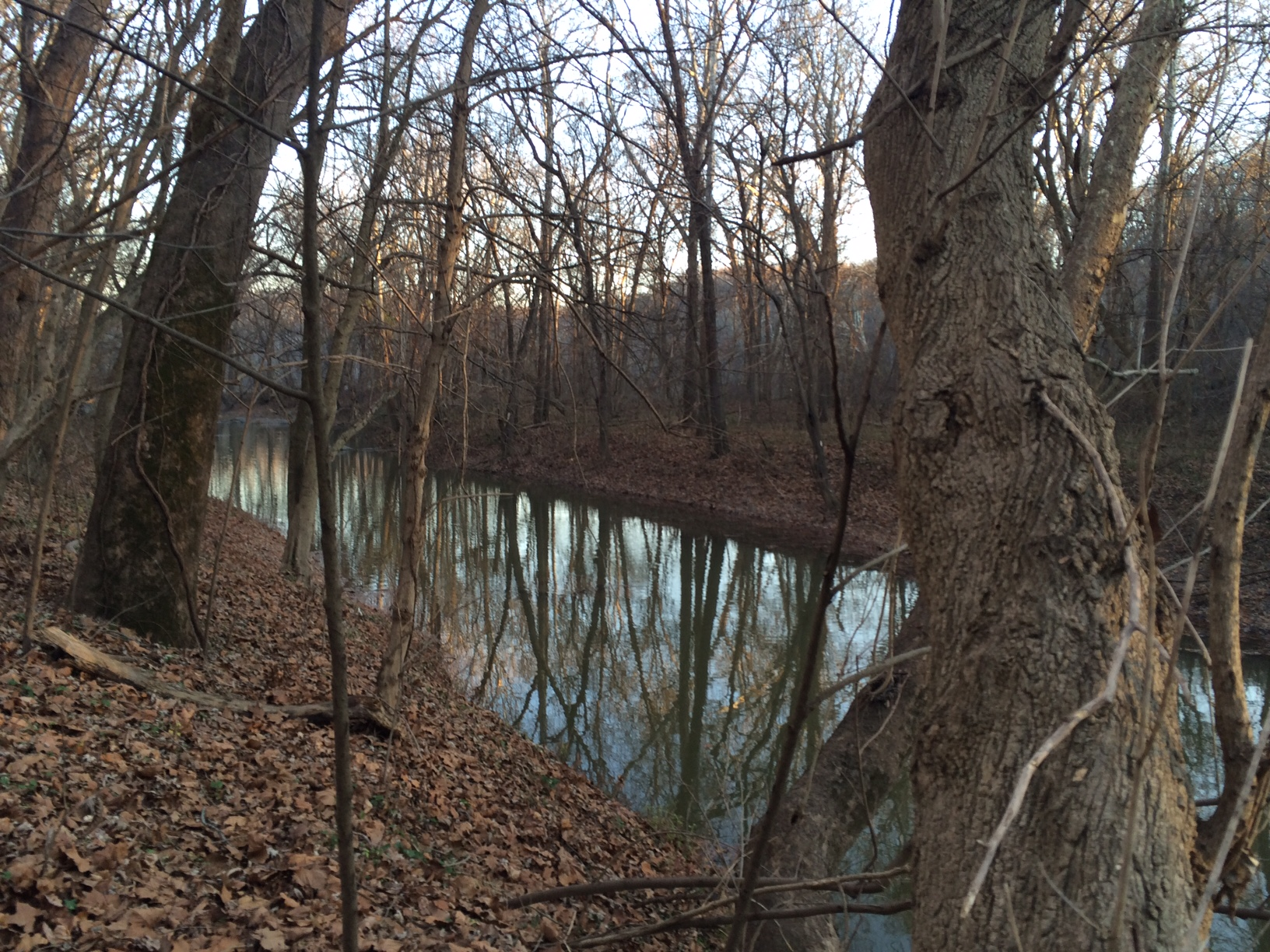
Plummers Island (on the right)

Scientific study of Plummers Island began in 1899, when botanist Charles Louis Pollard formed the Washington Biologists' Field Club and began the search for a field camp near the club's Washington, D.C. home. The club leased the island in 1901, and bought it seven years later; the island is now owned by the U.S. National Park Service, located within Chesapeake and Ohio Canal National Historical Park.

A 2008 issue of the Bulletin of the Biological Society of Washington was dedicated to articles about the flora and fauna of the island. The study of the island's three main plant communities, riparian, terrace, and upland forest, documented 3,012 insect species in 253 families, in 18 orders: Collembola, Odonata, Dermaptera, Blattodea, Phasmatodea, Orthoptera, Psocoptera, Thysanoptera, Hemiptera, Neuroptera, Megaloptera, Coleoptera, Mecoptera, Trichoptera, Lepidoptera, Diptera, Siphonaptera, and Hymenoptera. Another of the studies reported 19 species of freshwater mollusks (7 bivalves, 12 gastropods) in the island's immediate area, bringing the total known for the Middle Potomac River to 42 species. A periodically updated checklist which includes all the vascular plants of the flora, including ferns, fern allies, gymnosperms, and flowering plants, that have ever been reported growing in the wild on the island and its adjacent mainland, totals 885 plant species, of which 704 are native, and 181 naturalized.

== American Legion Bridge expansion ==
In September 2017, Maryland Governor Larry Hogan announced plans to widen Interstate Highways I-270 and I-495 (Capital Beltway) with toll-funded express lanes; planned, built, and operated through a public-private partnership (P3). This plan would also require widening the American Legion Bridge.

On July 10, 2020, the Maryland Department of Transportation (MDOT) released its more than 18,000-page Draft Environmental Impact Statement (DEIS) on the project, which addresses the construction project's impacts on people and the environment. If implemented, the highway expansion would fragment Plummers Island, which is located immediately downstream of the bridge. It would destroy or require relocation of the channel that separates the island from the mainland, clear-cut trees, and level a significant portion of the island. The native beech forest on the mainland side would also have to be cut down; wetlands between the mainland and the island would be destroyed, which can lead to a heavy infestation with invasive plants.

In August 2022 the Federal Highway Administration approved the proposed project. In October 2022 environmental and historic preservation groups filed suit against the state, citing deficiencies in the environmental review process and the projected impacts on Plummers Island.
