= Tidewater Lock =

Defunct canal lock in Washington, D.C.

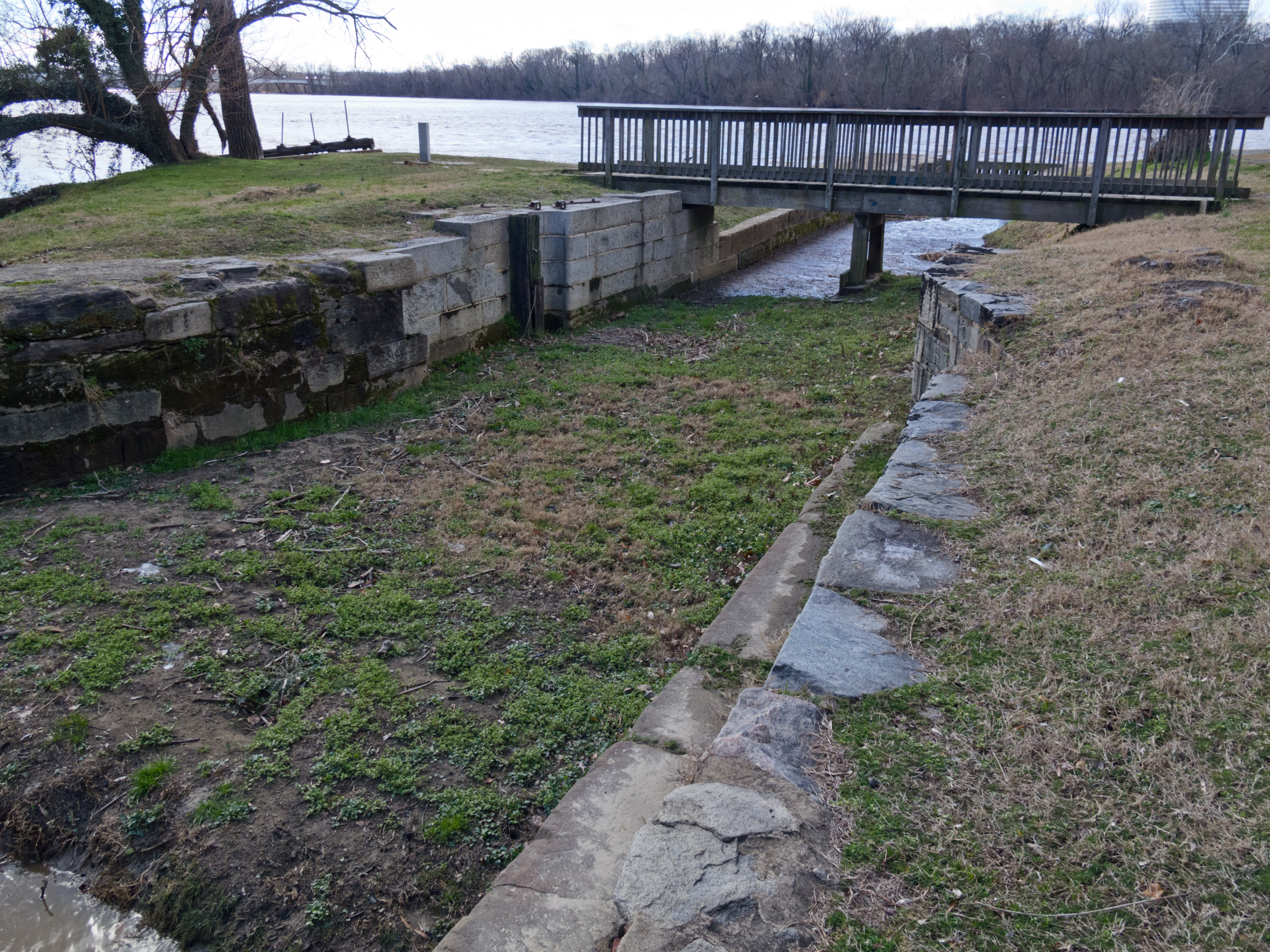
- Interactive map of Tidewater Lock
- 38.8999°N 77.0578°W
- Waterway: Chesapeake and Ohio Canal
- Country: USA
- State: Washington, D.C.
- Operation: Defunct
- Length: 54 m
- Width: 4 m

The Tidewater Lock is a dam in Washington, D.C., west of the mouth of Rock Creek at the Potomac River, on the east side of Georgetown. Built to connect the Potomac and the Chesapeake and Ohio Canal, opened in 1831, it was a busy maritime intersection during several decades of the canal's heyday. C&O documents refer to it as Lock 0 or Tide Lock A. Today, the lock marks Milestone 0 of the National Park Service's Chesapeake & Ohio Canal trail.

Canal documents sometimes list a "Tide Lock B" on section "I", completed in 1834 by the lockhouse at 17th and Constitution Ave NW.

== Gallery ==
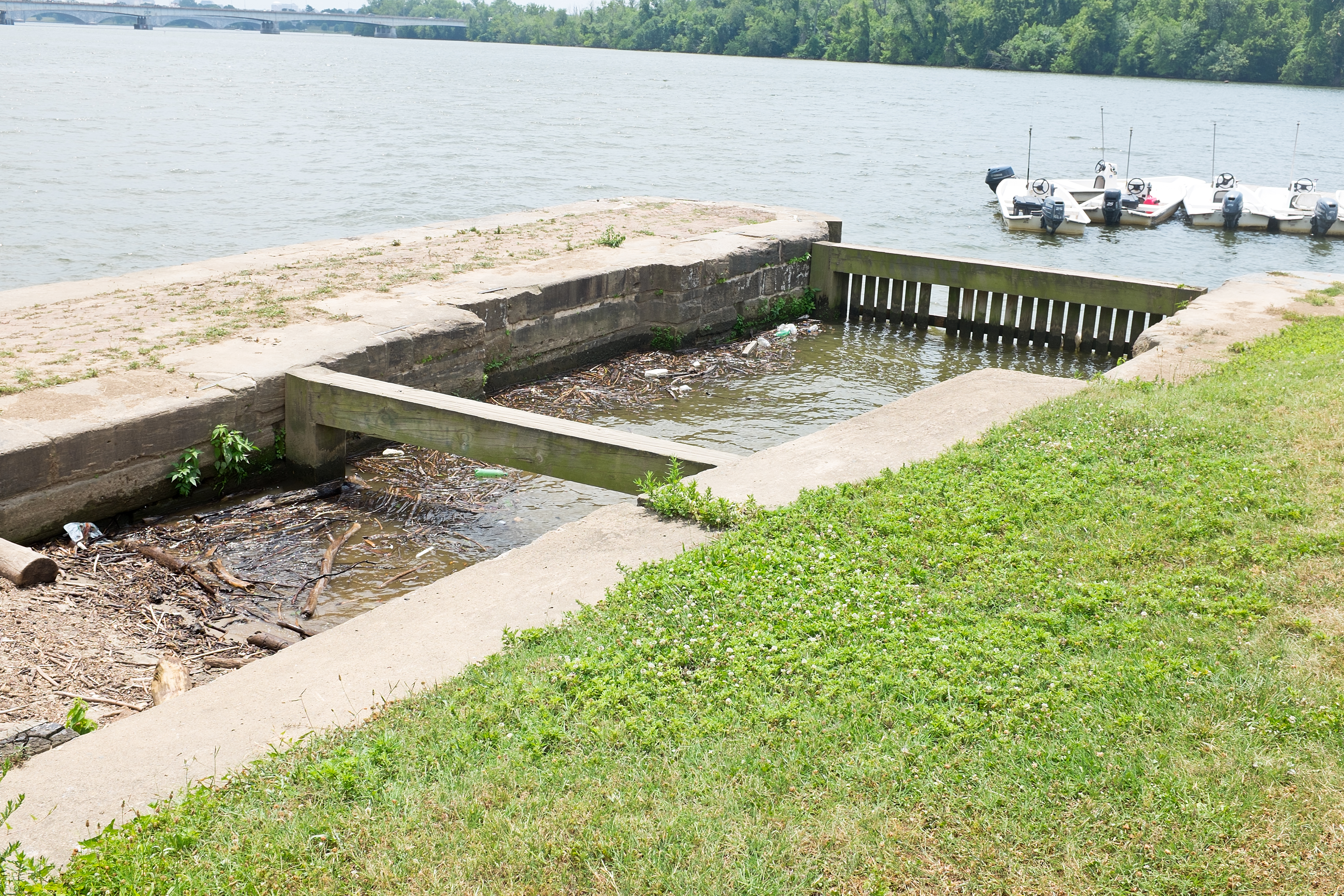
View of downstream gate pocket where the canal joins the Potomac River

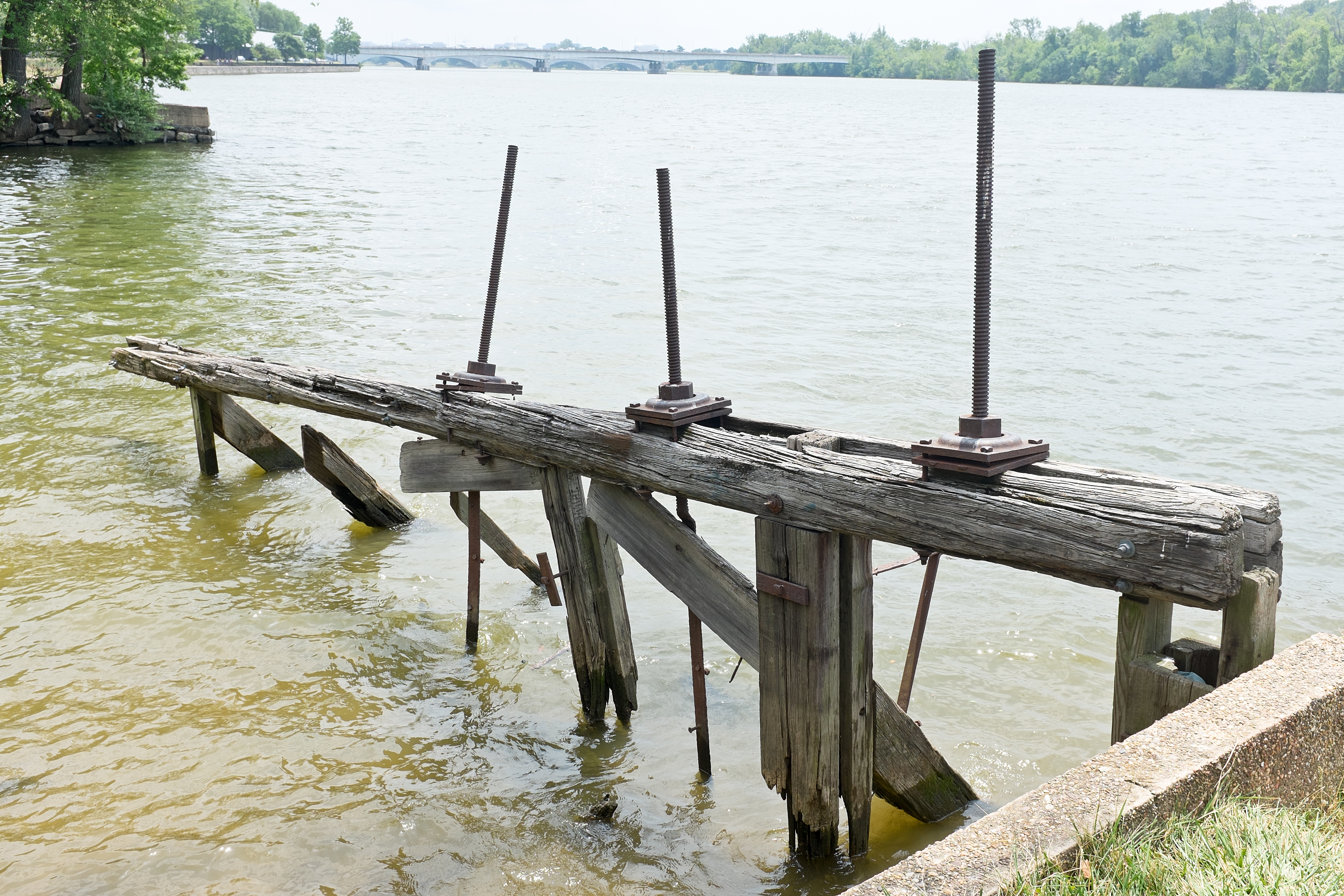
Ruins of the waste weir, which adjoins the Tidewater lock

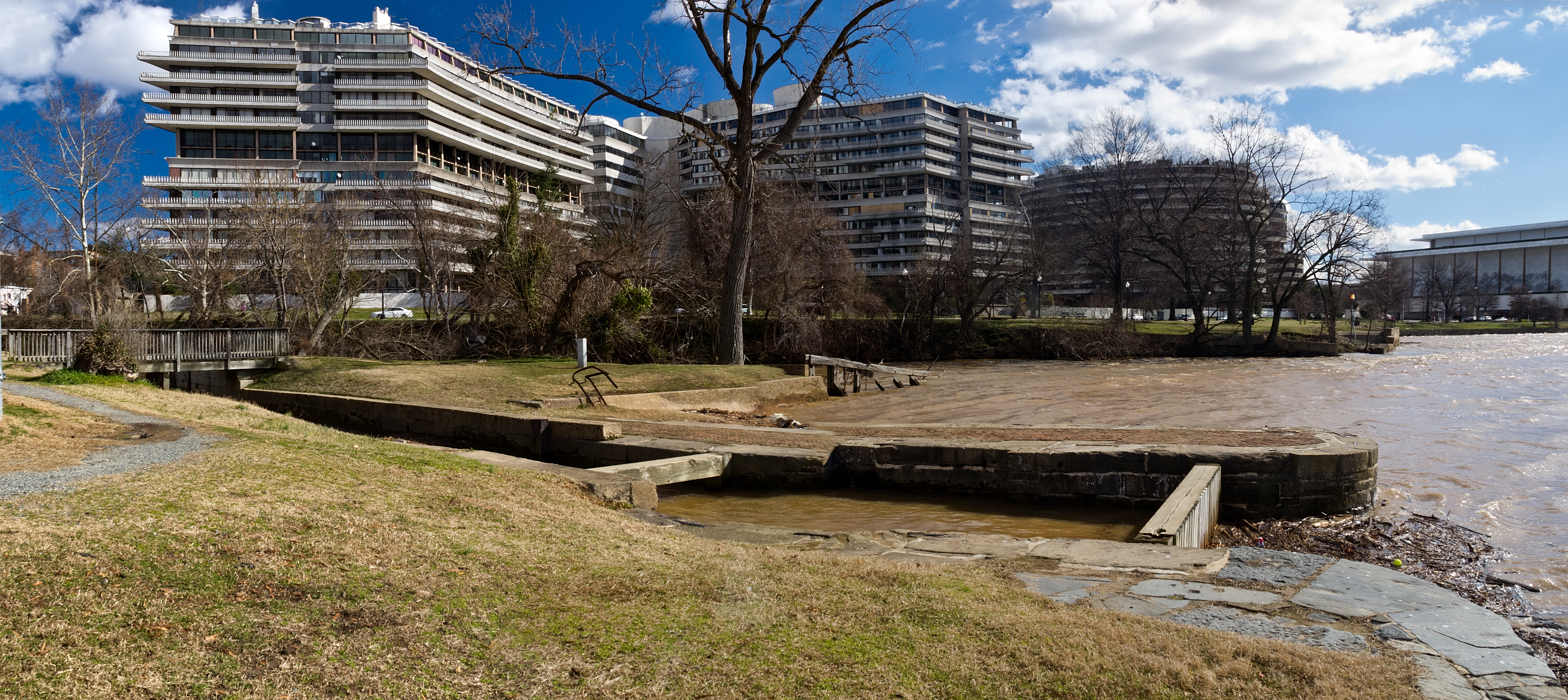
Tidewater lock, with the Watergate complex in the background

== See also ==
- Locks on the C&O Canal
