= American Legion Memorial Bridge (Potomac River) =

Potomac River crossing between the states of Maryland and Virginia, United States

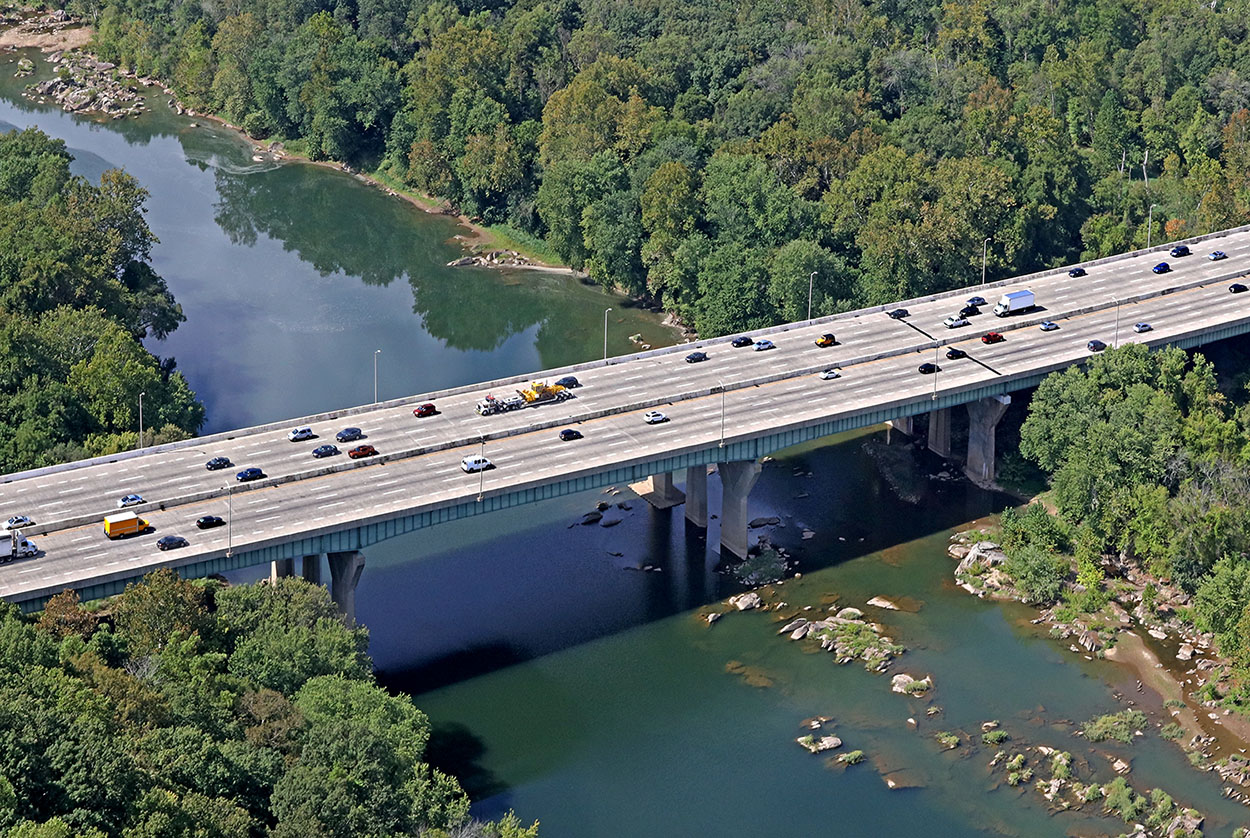
- Coordinates: 38.97017°N 77.17962°W
- Carries: 10 lanes of I-495, 8 thru lanes and 2 auxiliary lanes
- Crosses: Potomac River
- Locale: Montgomery County, Maryland and Fairfax County, Virginia
- Official name: American Legion Memorial Bridge
- Other name: Legion Bridge
- Maintained by: Maryland State Highway Administration

History
- Opened: December 31, 1962 (63 years ago)

Statistics
- Daily traffic: 232,000 (2010)

Location
- Interactive map of American Legion Memorial Bridge

The American Legion Memorial Bridge, also known as the American Legion Bridge and formerly as the Cabin John Bridge, is a bridge carrying Interstate 495 (Capital Beltway) across the Potomac River between Montgomery County, Maryland and Fairfax County, Virginia in the United States. It is an American Water Landmark. Plummers Island is located immediately downstream of the bridge.

The bridge has five traffic lanes in each direction. The outermost lane in each direction is an entrance/exit-only lane for traffic to/from the Clara Barton Parkway in Maryland and the George Washington Memorial Parkway and Georgetown Pike (State Route 193) in Virginia. There are no facilities for pedestrians or cyclists, which are prohibited.

== History ==
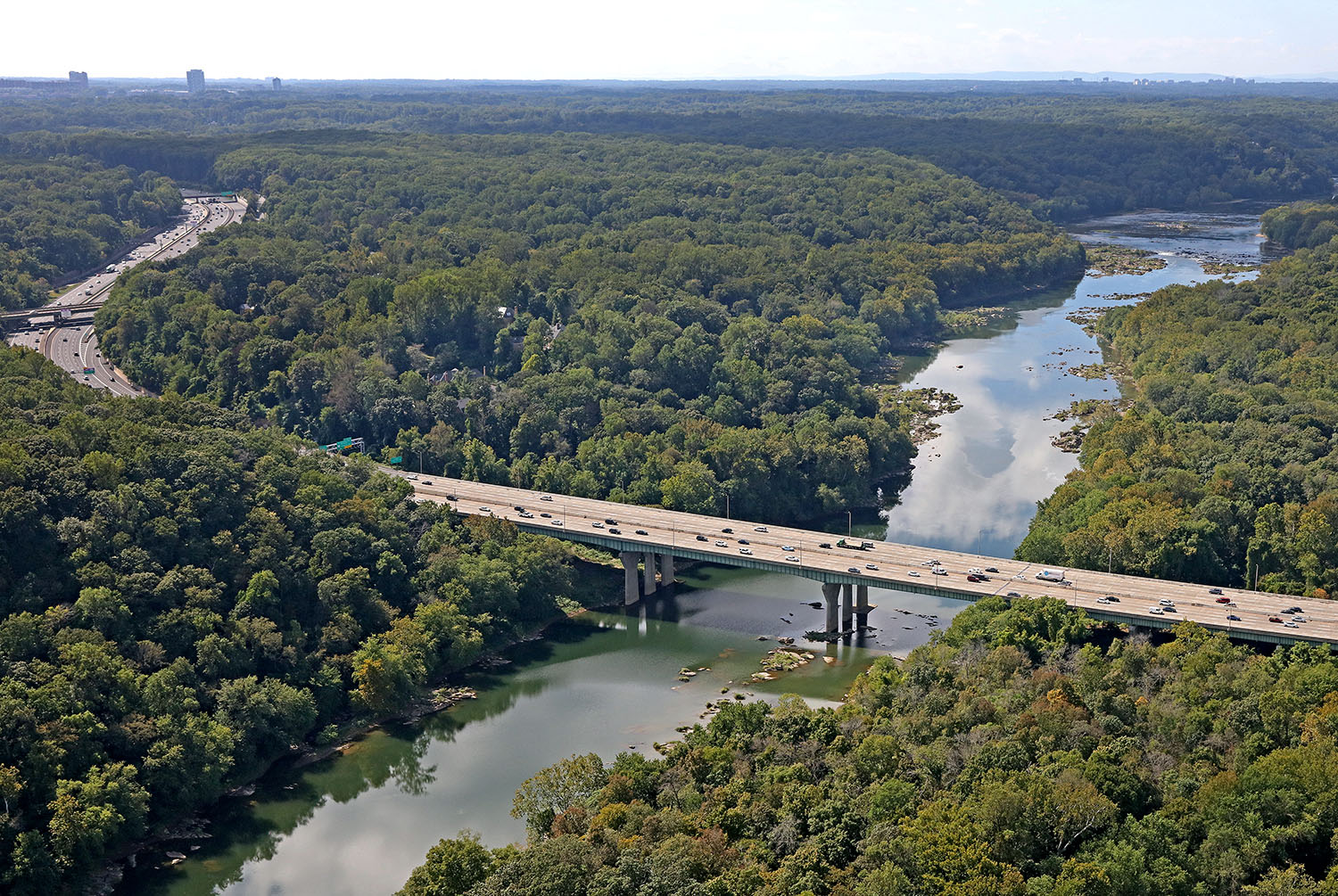
American Legion Memorial Bridge over Potomac River

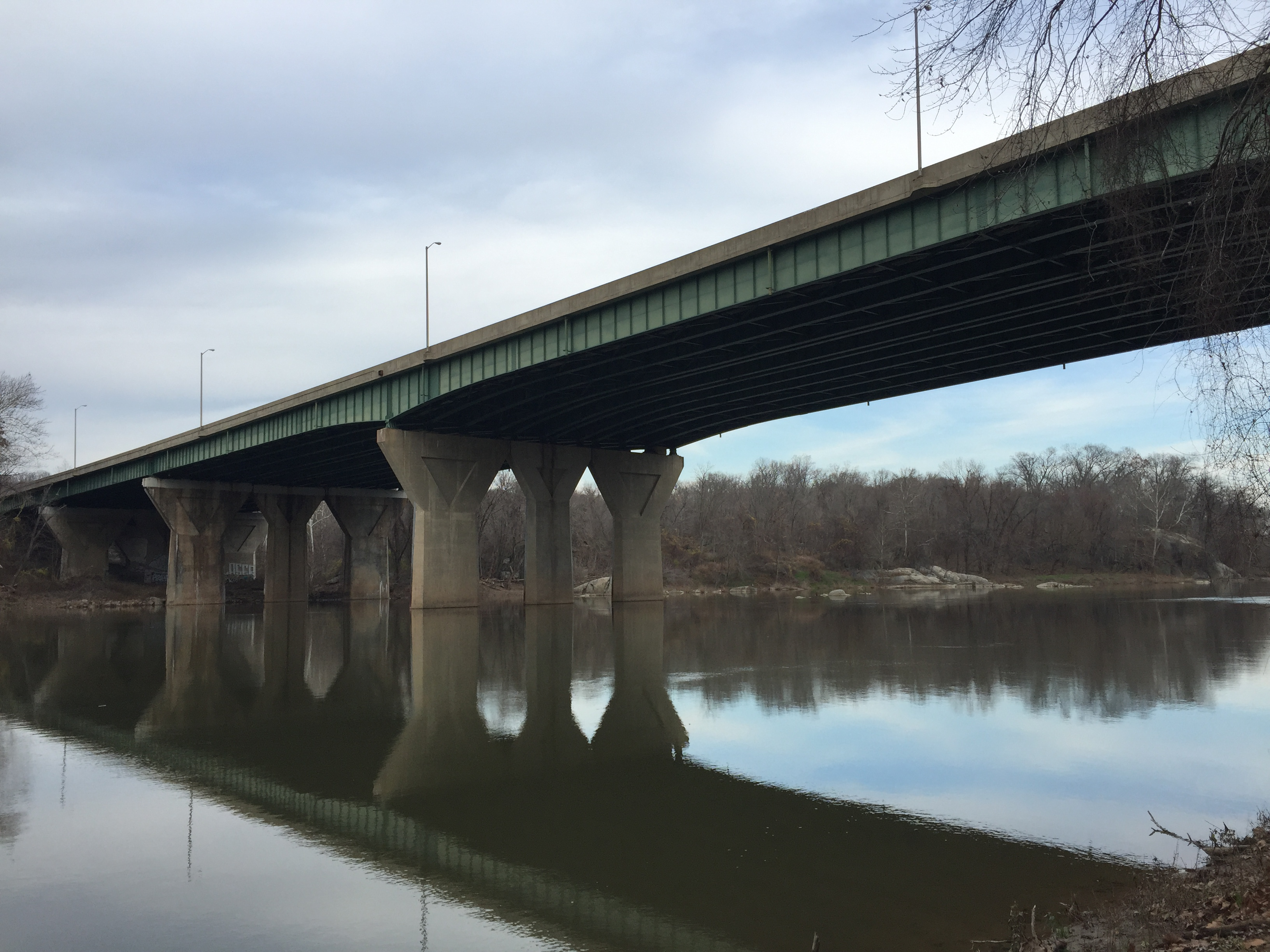
View of the west side of the bridge from the south bank

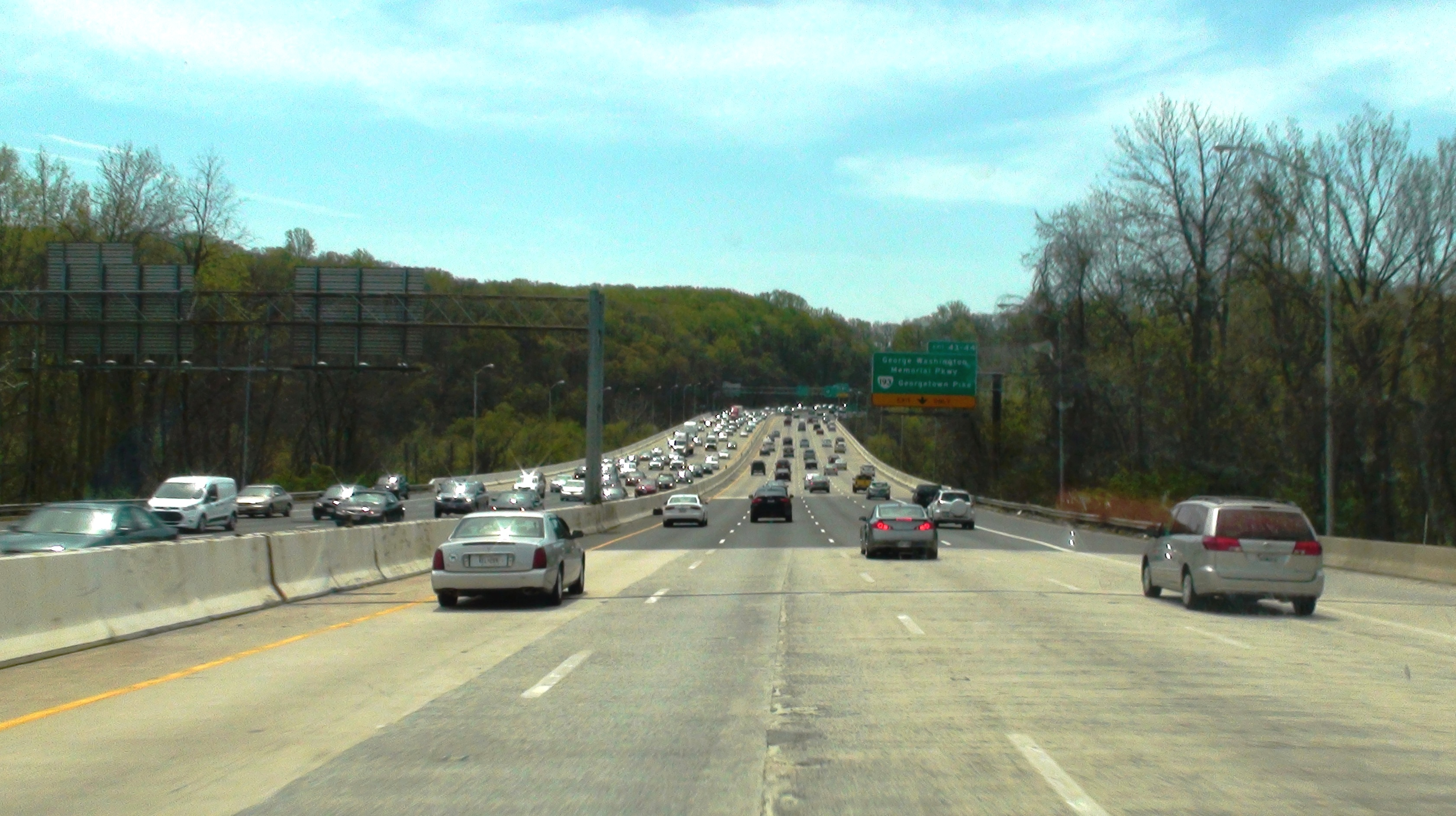
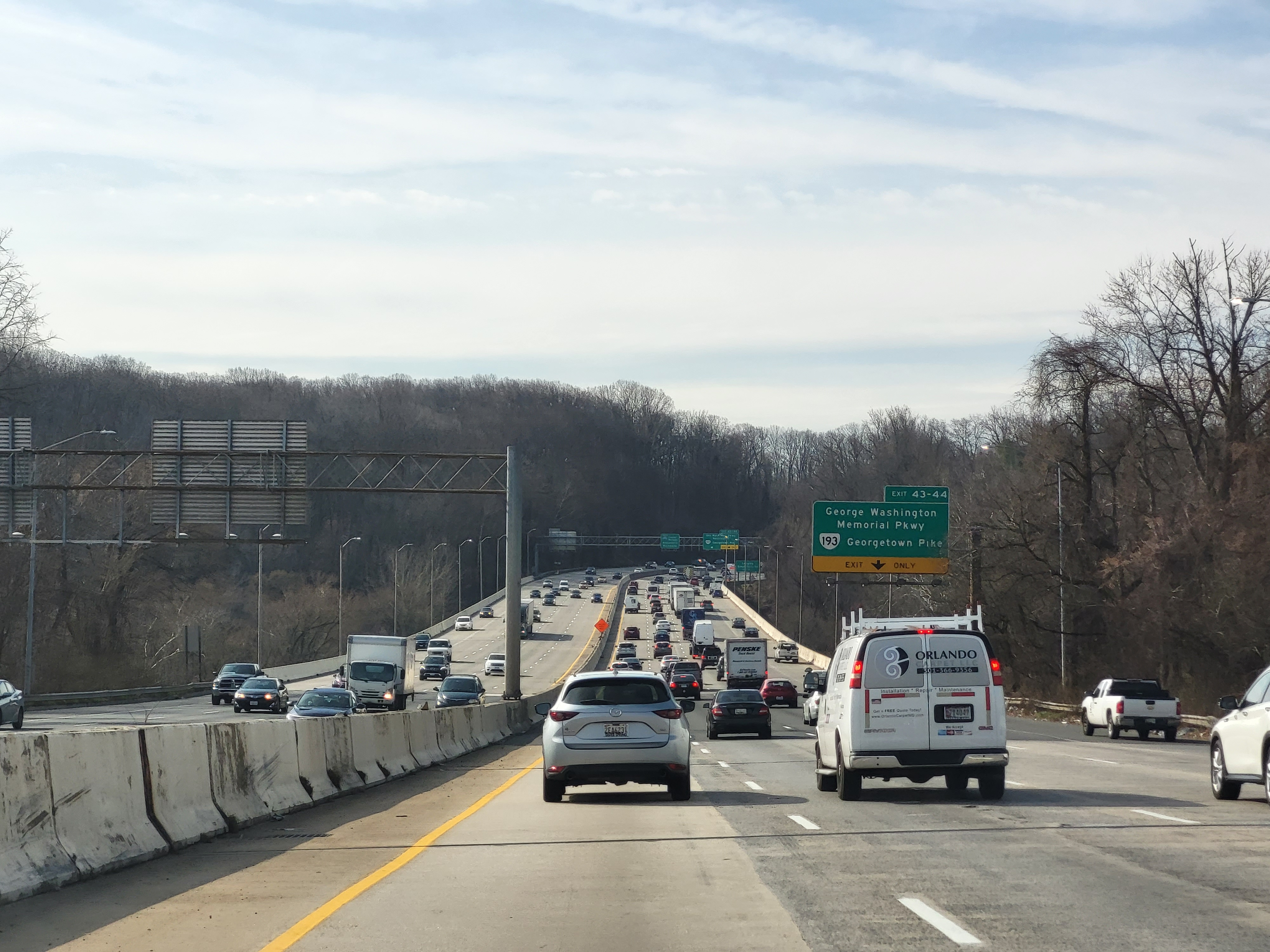
The southbound portion of the bridge in April 2014 and February 2023

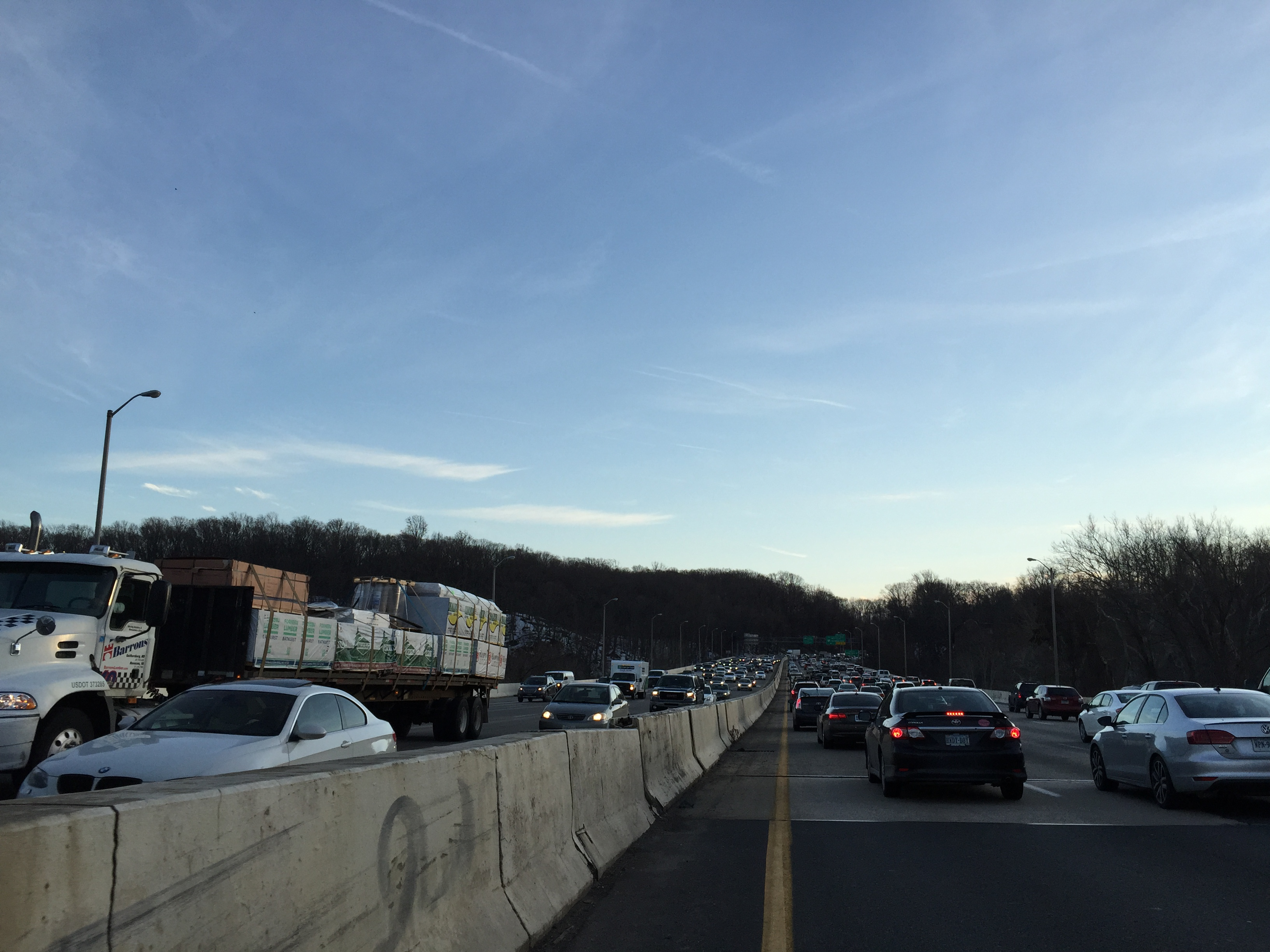
Heavy congestion on the bridge during rush hour

Opened on December 31, 1962, the bridge was originally named the "Cabin John Bridge" because of its proximity to the community of Cabin John on the Maryland side of the Potomac River. The bridge opened without a ceremony due to the cold weather. On May 30, 1969, the bridge was officially renamed the "American Legion Memorial Bridge" in a ceremony led by Lt. Gen. Lewis B. Hershey, director of the U.S. Selective Service System. This action reduced confusion with the Union Arch Bridge, which carries the Washington Aqueduct and MacArthur Boulevard across Cabin John Creek and which some people also called "the Cabin John Bridge". The bridge was widened from its original 6-lane configuration to the current 10-lane version by 1992 via a third span filling the median between what was originally two separate spans.

The American Legion Memorial Bridge is an important commuter route because of its proximity to edge cities and high tech centers in Maryland and Virginia. It is the only high volume crossing between Montgomery County, Maryland and Fairfax County, Virginia, the most populous counties in their respective states. It is also the only major crossing between Maryland and Virginia between the Point of Rocks Bridge, more than 30 miles (50 km) upstream and the Chain Bridge downstream between the Commonwealth of Virginia and the District of Columbia. Congestion on the American Legion Bridge and commuter travel between the western Washington suburbs in both states has fueled support for a western bridge around the Loudoun County/Fairfax County line in Virginia (Virginia Route 28/Fairfax County Parkway area), or farther out as part of the Western Transportation Corridor. Opponents claim that another bridge would increase development in those areas, increase traffic, and generate more pollution in the Chesapeake Bay. The bridge crosses the western terminus of the Potomac Heritage Trail and the George Washington Memorial Parkway on the Virginian side of the Potomac River. On the Maryland side, the bridge crosses over MacArthur Boulevard, the Clara Barton Parkway and the Chesapeake and Ohio Canal. Lock 13 (Seven Locks 6) of the canal is underneath the bridge.

The American Legion Memorial Bridge is one of the two locations at which the Capital Beltway crosses the Potomac River; the other is the Woodrow Wilson Memorial Bridge.

== American Legion Bridge expansion ==
In September 2017, Maryland Governor Larry Hogan announced plans to widen interstate highways I-270 and I-495 (Capital Beltway) with toll-funded express lanes planned, built, and operated through a public–private partnership (P3). It was announced on November 12, 2019, that the existing spans will be rebuilt and replaced with a new structure expanding capacity from eight to twelve lanes.

On July 10, 2020, the Maryland Department of Transportation (MDOT) released its more than 18,000-page Draft Environmental Impact Statement (DEIS) on the project, which addresses the construction project's impacts on people and the environment.

The expansion project would destroy large parts of Plummers Island, which is located immediately downstream of the bridge. It would destroy or require relocation of the channel that separates the island from the mainland, clear-cut trees, and level a significant portion of the island. The native beech forest on the mainland side would also have to be cut down; wetlands between the mainland and the island would be destroyed, which can lead to a heavy infestation with invasive plants.

In August 2022 the Federal Highway Administration approved the proposed project. In October 2022 environmental and historic preservation groups filed suit against the state, citing deficiencies in the environmental review process and the projected impacts on Plummers Island. In November 2022 MDOT announced that it would not award a contract for construction of the proposed expansion project until after Governor Hogan left office in January 2023. Decisions on the project will be made by the administration of newly elected governor Wes Moore and the Maryland Board of Public Works.

In August 2023, MDOT applied for a federal grant to support rebuilding of the bridge and expand a portion of I-495 leading to the junction with I-270.

In December 2024, Northern Virginia leaders shared that the NOVA community needs to continue to apply pressure for the bridge project to be initiated. Fairfax County Board of Supervisors Chairman Jeff McKay shared, "The bridge has to be rebuilt. It's way overdue. We're in a clock that is already ticking".

== See also ==
- List of crossings of the Potomac River
