= Locks on the Chesapeake and Ohio Canal =

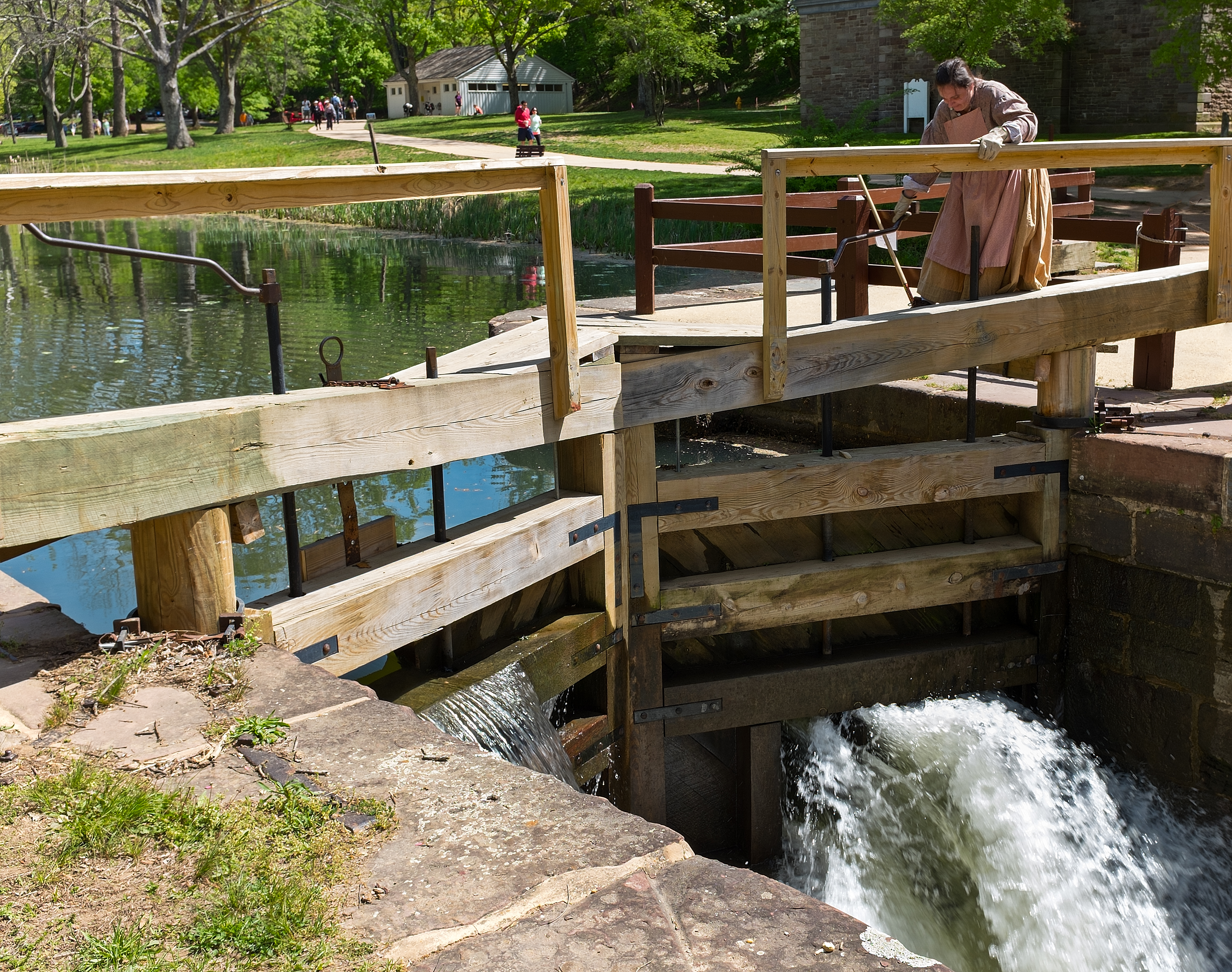
Opening paddle valves on Lock 20

The Locks on the Chesapeake and Ohio Canal, located in Maryland, West Virginia, and Washington, D.C. of the United States, were of three types: lift locks; river locks; and guard, or inlet, locks.

They were numbered 1 to 75, including two locks with fractional numbers (63 1/3 and 64 2/3) and none numbered 65. There is also the Tidewater Lock, sometimes called Lock 0, lock at the downstream end of the canal in Washington, D.C., where Rock Creek flows into the Potomac River.

The fractional numbering arose because locks 70–75 were completed in 1842, before locks 62 and 66. It was found that the level of the canal between locks 62 and 66 could be raised in three steps instead of four. So the additional locks through there were numbered 1 1/3 steps apart (62, 63 1/3, 64 2/3, and 66) so that the other locks, already completed, did not have to be renumbered.

While one source states that it takes about 10 minutes for a boat to lock through, experiments done in the 1830s show that it was possible for a boat to go through in 3 minutes on average and as fast as 2 1/2 minutes, while in 1897, it was shown that steamboats took 5 or 7 minutes to lock through going upstream or downstream (respectively).

== Guard locks ==
Guard locks (inlet locks) regulated the water supply to the canal. At the slackwaters (particularly at Big Slackwater and Little Slackwater), they also allowed boats to reenter the canal from the slackwater. There is no guard lock #7, since Dam #7 that was proposed to be around mile 164 near the mouth of South Branch was never built. A steam pump was later put where this dam would have been in 1856. In 1872, a new steam pump was put 10 miles upstream at mile 174.2, and gave about 24 cubic feet per second of water.

The first guard lock was made of structures from George Washington's Potomac Company Little Falls skirting canal, and were repurposed for the C&O.

The second guard lock at Violette's lock, was confusingly numbered Lock 24 for a period of time when that was the end of the canal. Later, when the section up to Dam #3 (Harpers Ferry) was opened, Lock 24 was the lock at the Seneca Aqueduct (i.e. Riley's Lock). Guard lock #2 is also 88 feet 5 inches long, making it too small for a standard C & O canal boat (92 feet) to go through.

Lock	Miles	Name	Nearby landmarks	Coordinates	Date	Photo
1	5	Guard Lock #1	Consists of 2 gates: a feeder and guard gate.	38.939847°N 77.122232°W 38.940797°N 77.12331°W	c. 1795	
2	22	Guard Lock #2	Violette's lock	39.06694°N 77.328851°W	Nov 1830	
3	62	Guard Lock #3	Above Harpers Ferry	39.33623478012774°N 77.75199501711157°W	Sept 1833	
4	85.4	Guard Lock #4	Big Slackwater	39.503118°N 77.845039°W	Apr 1834	
5	106.8	Guard Lock #5	Little Slackwater	39.607337°N 77.92211°W	Jan 1835	
6	134	Guard Lock #6		39.62482639486258°N 78.29161104978726°W	Oct 1838	
7	164	Not built				
8	184.5	Guard Lock #8	End of Canal, Cumberland MD	39.648353°N 78.763884°W	May 1850	

== River locks ==
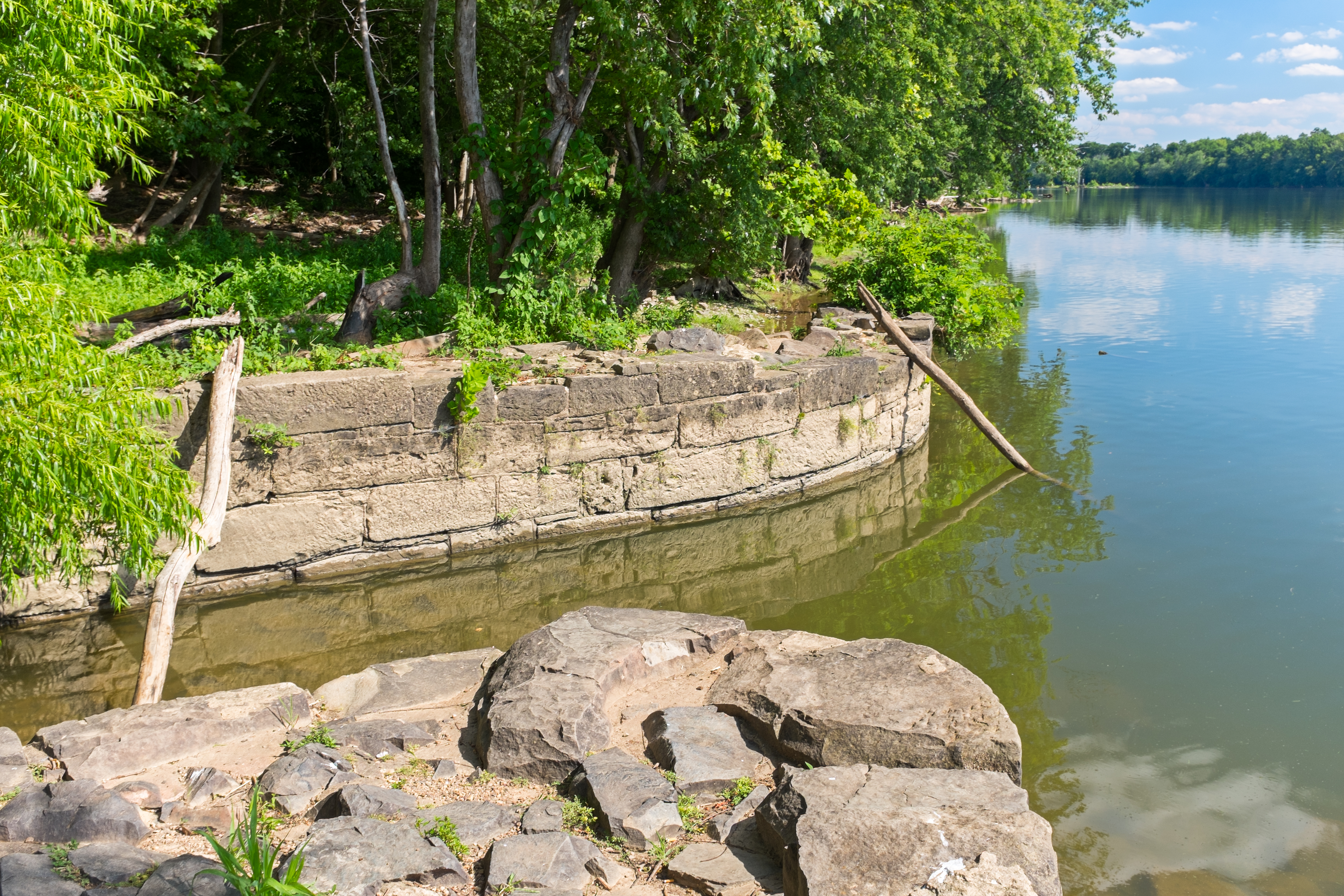
Goose Creek River Lock on the Chesapeake and Ohio Canal, where it opens to the Potomac River. Goose Creek itself is on the Virginia shore on the other side of the river, just upstream of this photo..

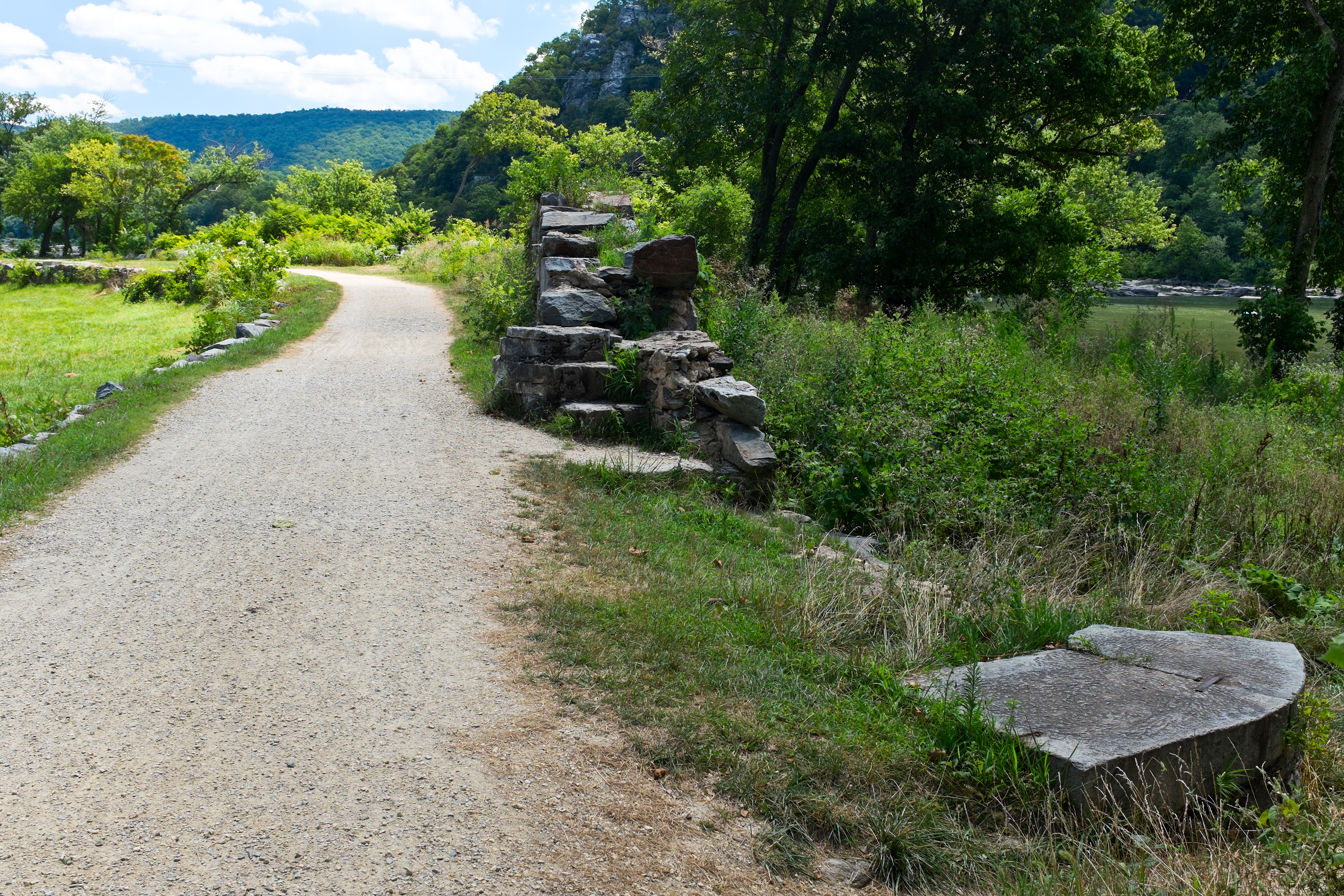
Shenandoah River Lock on the canal, across the river from Harpers Ferry. The two stones at the lower right corner are what is left of the lock. Canal prism itself is on the left of the towpath.

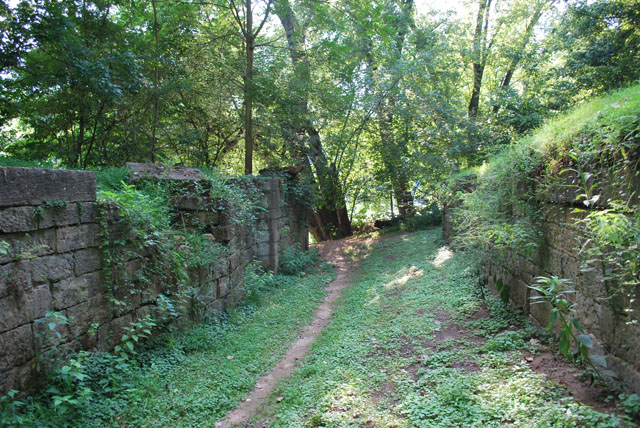
Shepherdstown river lock, below Lock 38. When the dam washed out in 1889, this lock was made redundant, and was abandoned.

Three sets of river locks (not counting the guard locks) were used for traffic coming from Virginia.

The Goose Creek locks were 0.2 miles below Edwards Ferry (Lock 25), in section 51 used for traffic coming from Goose Creek on the Virginia shore. It allowed boats from the Goose Creek and Little River Navigation Company to enter. Only one Goose Creek boat was documented to enter the C&O canal, and there is no documentation of a C&O boat entering Goose Creek. The lock was eventually converted into a waste weir. The Goose Creek lock is a staircase lock or combine lock: two locks with no intervening pound or basin, the upper gate of the lower lock being the same gate as the lower gate of the second lock. It was perhaps the only such lock on the C&O Canal.

The Shenendoah river locks (section 109), were across from Harper's Ferry, just below Lock 33 at the Shenandoah River. This lock let boats cross to Harpers Ferry with the mules walking on the railroad bridge, up the Shenandoah river, to the old Potomac Canal Bypass on the Shenandoah river by Virginius island. The railroad refused to let mules walk on the bridge, and from lack of business, the lock was abandoned. Stones from that lock were used for other purposes.

The Shepherdstown river lock (section 133) was served by a dam for Botler's mill on the Virginia Side. An 1889 flood destroyed the dam and the slackwater that necessitated the lock. It was later filled in and used for the towpath.

== Lift locks ==
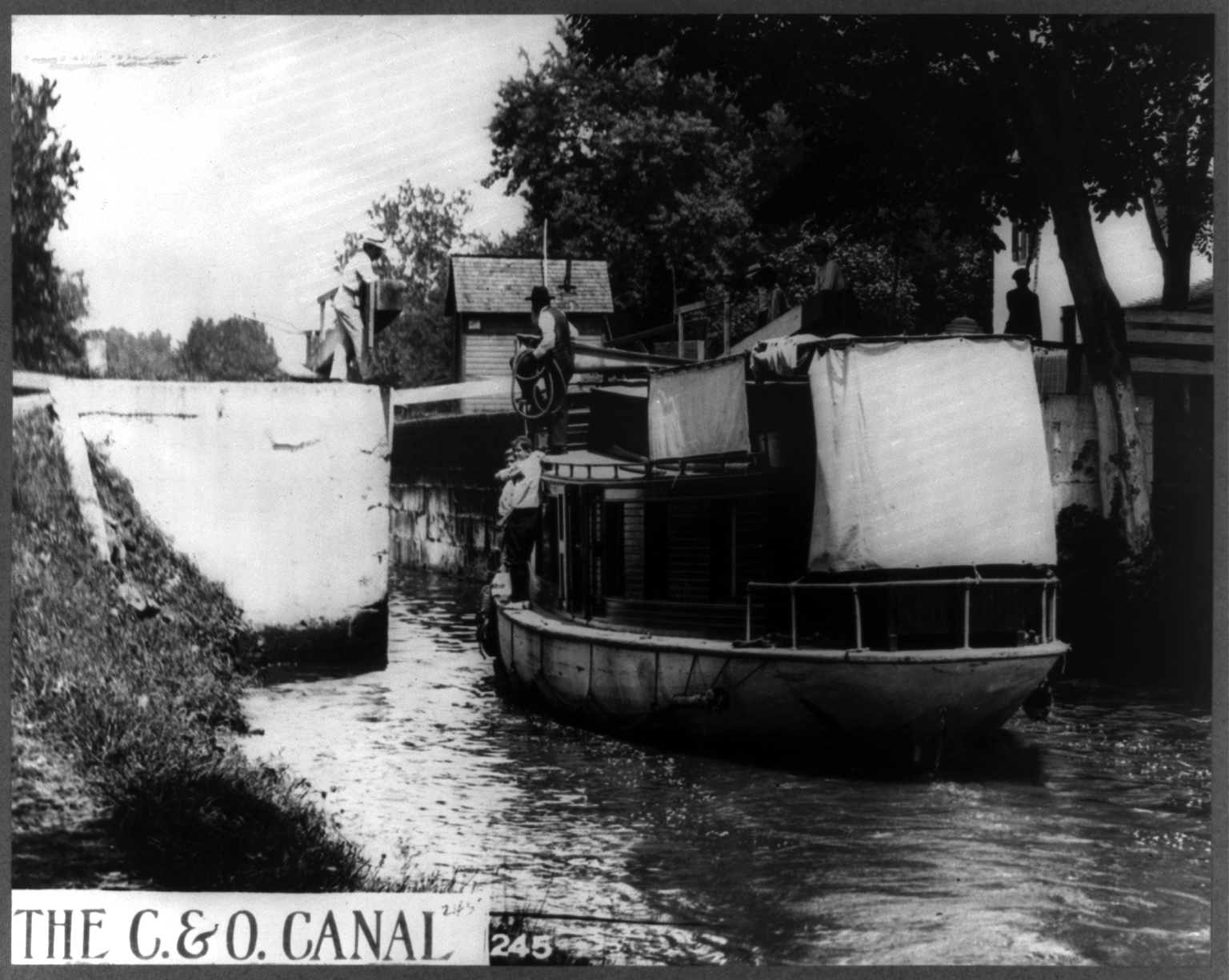
Lift lock during the operating days. Note the whitewash on this lock.

The 74 lift locks came in several varieties. A boat traveling the length of the canal would also go through two guard locks: at Big Slackwater and Little Slackwater.

Locks were typically 100 feet long, 15 feet wide, and 16 feet deep. They lifted boats between 6 and 10 feet. Typical freight boats were 92 feet long, but the rudder could be turned to fit into the few shorter locks, such as Lock 28 (Point of Rocks), which was 90 feet, 9 inches. The only lock shorter than 90 feet was the troublesome Lock 36 at 89 feet, 11 inches, being the only lock less than 90 feet in length.

Locks were often whitewashed to make them easier to see at dawn or dusk.

The locks were built on a foundation of 12 inch x 12 inch timbers, spaced about a foot apart, laid longitudinally below the walls, overlain by traverse timbers, also 12 inch x 12 inch. These in turn were overlain with 3-inch planks, with the masonry placed upon them. All timbers were intended to be permanently wet.

During construction, the builders left room on the berm side to allow another lock to be constructed alongside, but this never happened.

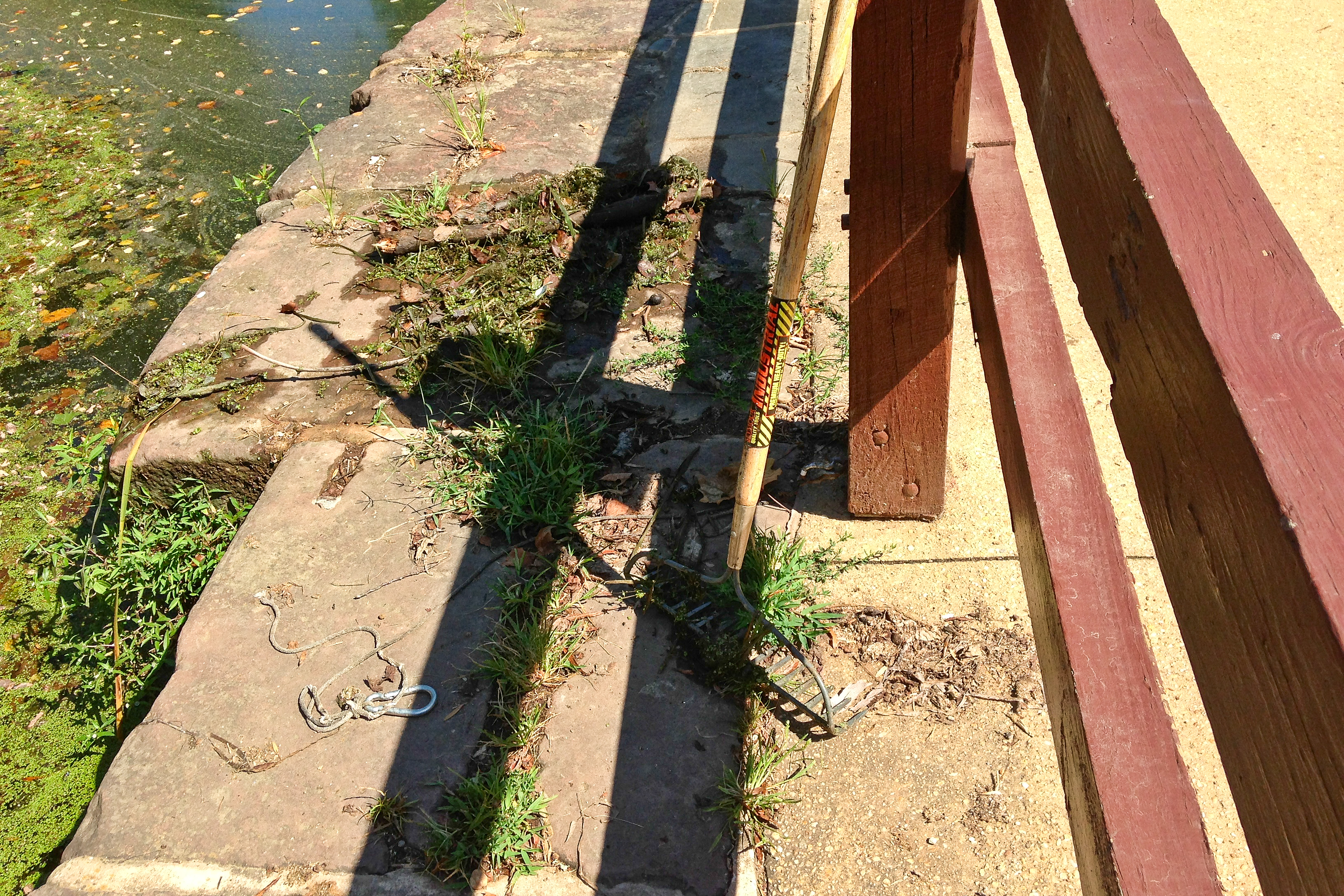
Rake and trash pulled out of water so that lock gates can be opened

Debris that got into the lock sometimes had to be removed with a pitchfork. If the paddle valve was stuck because of trash, the lock tender had a 20-foot pole with a hook to get the trash free.

Lock numbering changed over the years. Guard Lock No. 2 was numbered Lock 24 for a time, which could cause confusion with Riley's Lock, No 24, upstream. For a period of time in the early days, the locks were called by letters but that was later changed to numbers. Oddly enough, many of the lock numbers correspond to the contour elevation – e.g., Lock 26 is at the 260-foot elevation line, and lock 30 is at the 300-foot mark, although it is doubted that things were planned that way, and many locks do not correspond to the elevation: e.g., Lock 72 is at the 580-foot mark.

=== Lock design ===
Examples of the 1828 lock design (Note: these are from different locks).

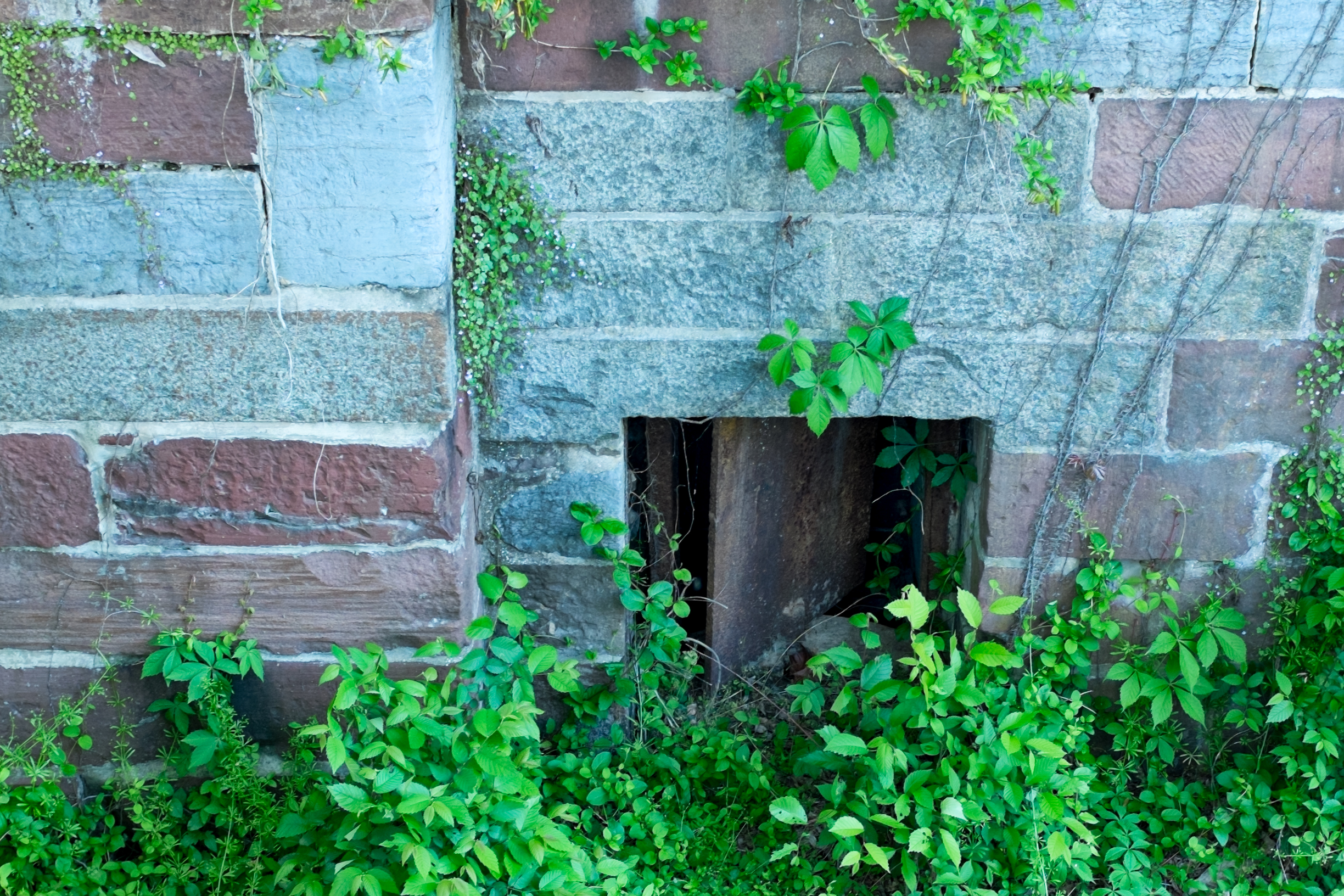
Paddle valve in wicket, in the lock masonry (Violette's Lock). This valve connected to a wicket stem (seen in the next photo).

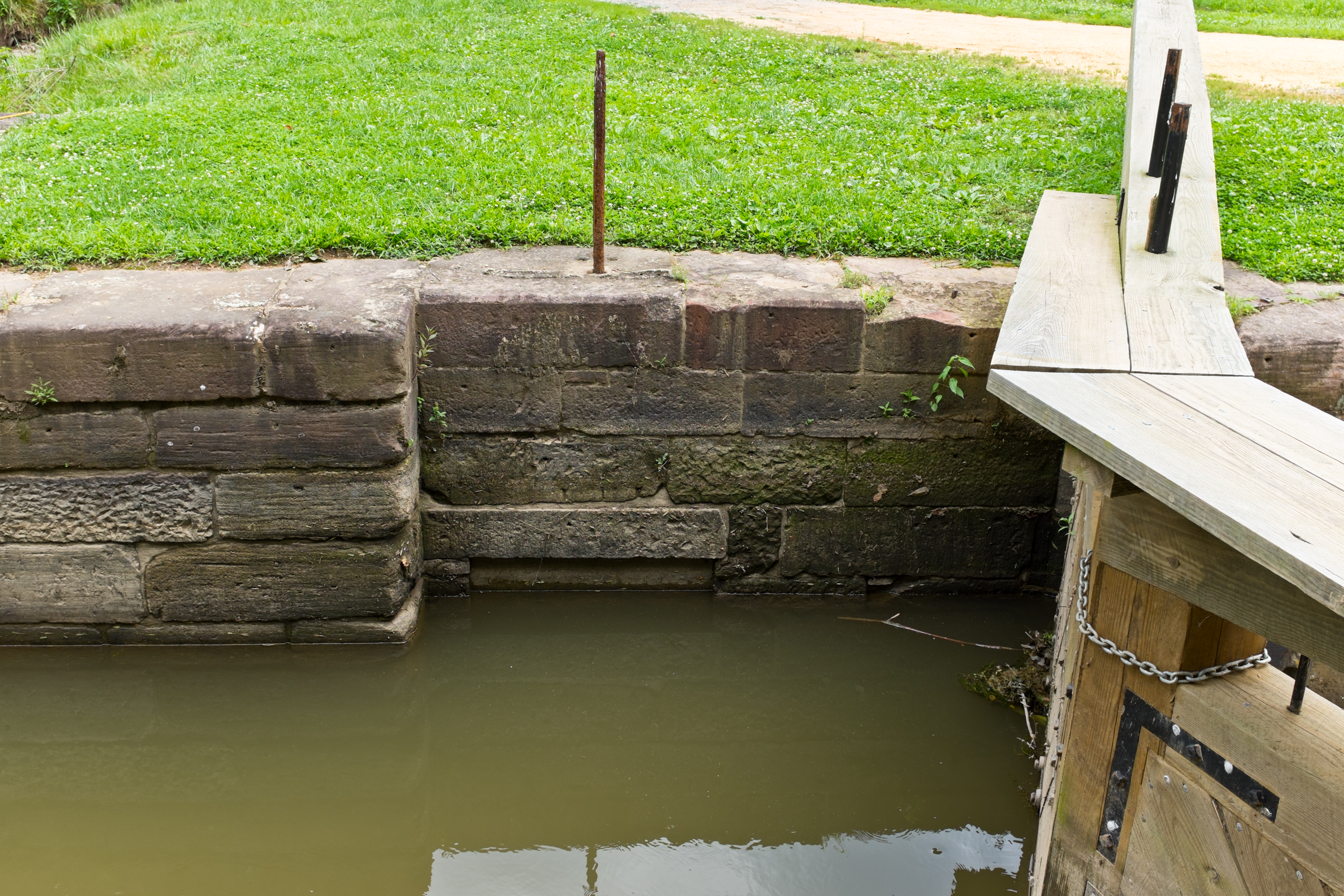
Wicket stem, sticking up through masonry of Pennyfield Lock, originally to open and close wicket. (Masonry wicket is permanently closed off, barely visible in photo).

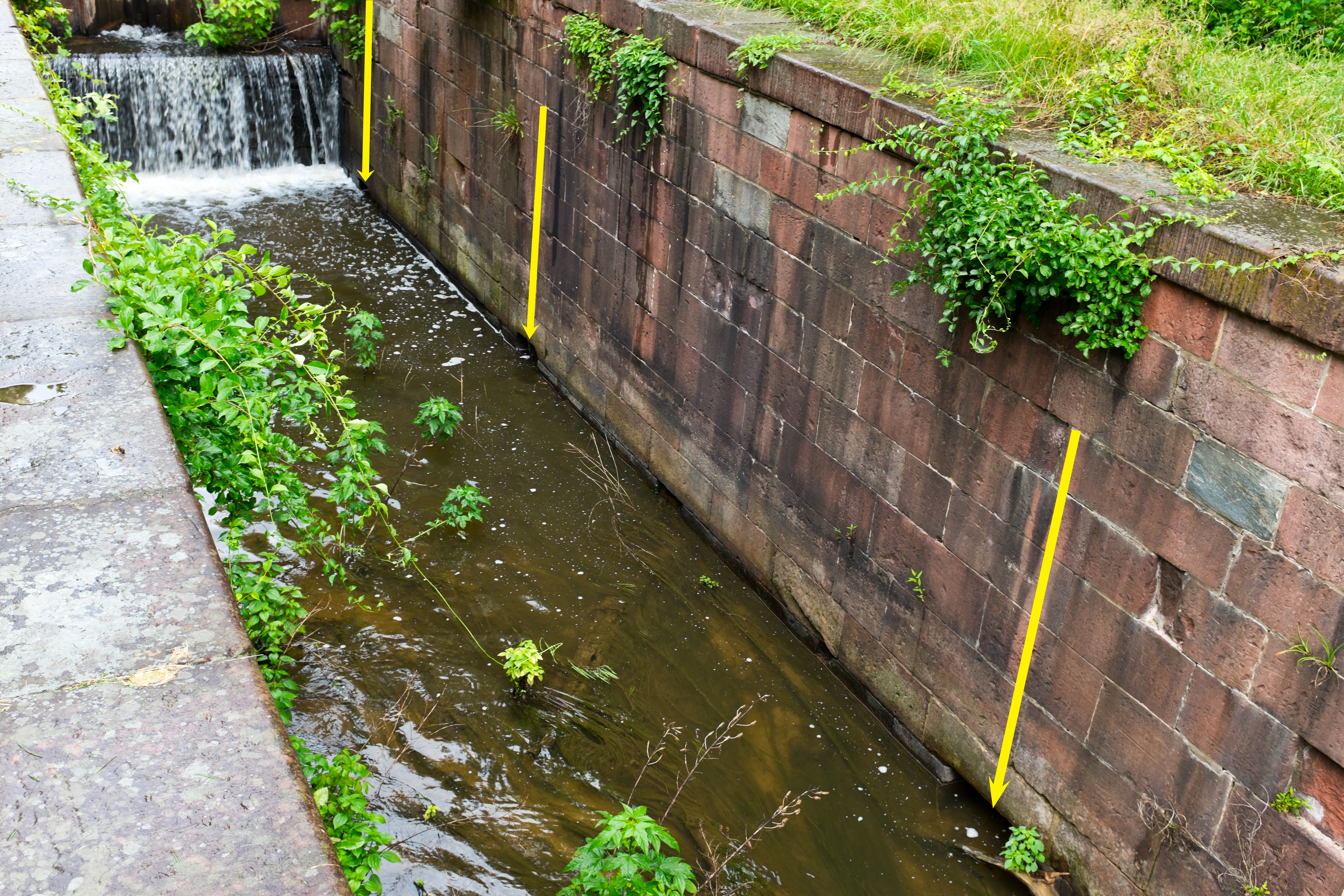
Openings to culverts to fill the lock chamber, indicated with yellow arrows (Lock 11).

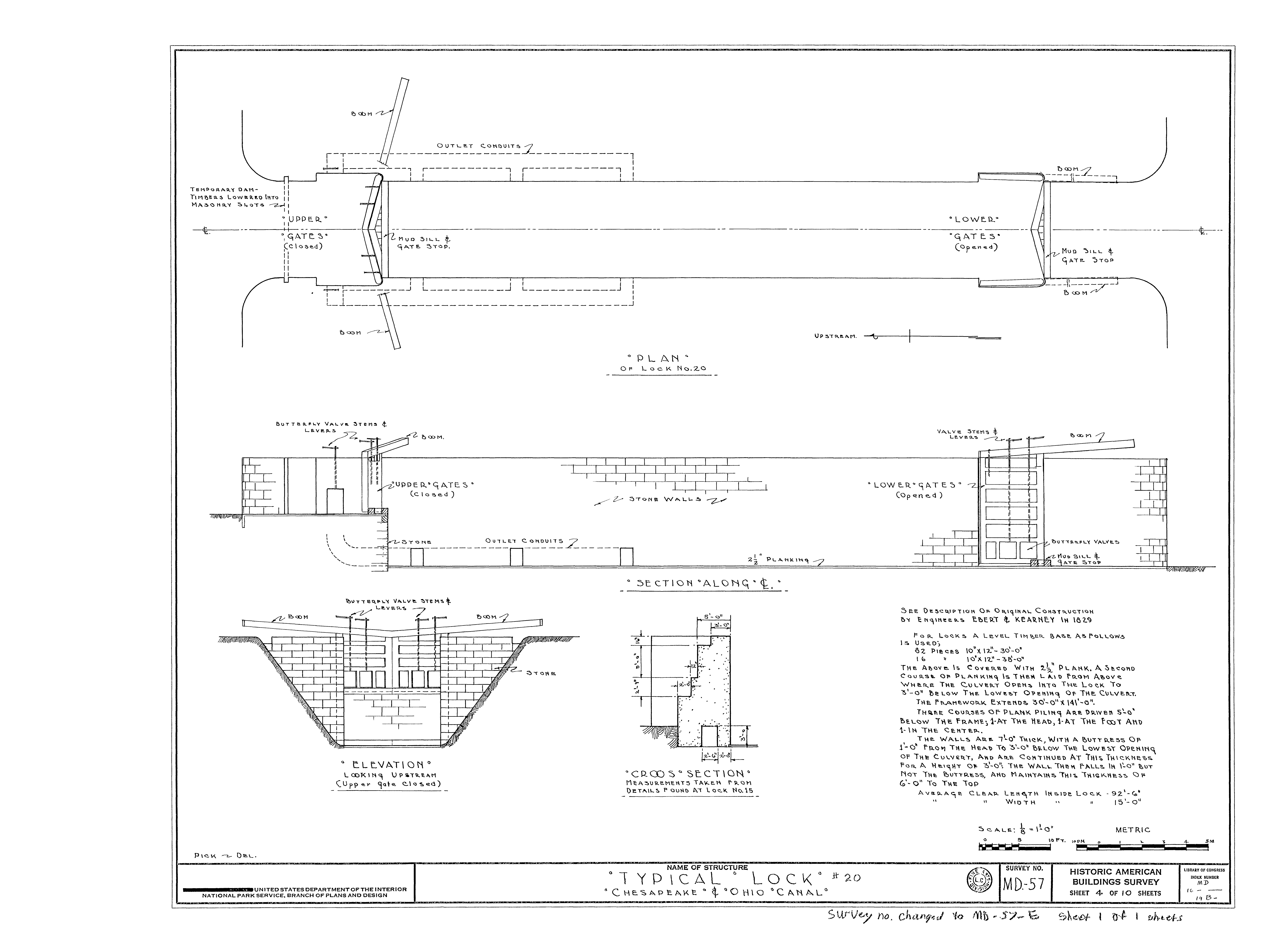
Drawing (from HABS) of Lock 20, showing paddle valve and conduits in lock masonry.

There were two designs used on the C&O Canal locks: the 1828 design and the 1830 design. Locks 1–27 (with the exception of lock 13) are to the older 1828 design, and locks 13 and 28–75 are of the 1830 design.

The 1828 design originally filled the lock chamber through the use of culverts in the lock masonry. The wicket, i.e. large paddle valve, hidden in the masonry recess where the upper gate fit in, would be opened, and water would flow through the lock masonry to three openings in the lock chamber. Both sides of the lock had these, so there would be a total of 2 wickets, and 6 openings. The upper gate is above the breast wall. Most of the wicket openings in the upper gate recess have been closed with masonry, but one wicket at Violettes Lock is still intact as of 2013 (see photo). Note that modern replacement gates in locks 1–23, have the wickets in the gates, since the original wickets in the lock masonry are inoperable. This system of routing water through the masonry was abandoned due to the tendency for debris to clog the opening.

Examples of the 1830 lock design

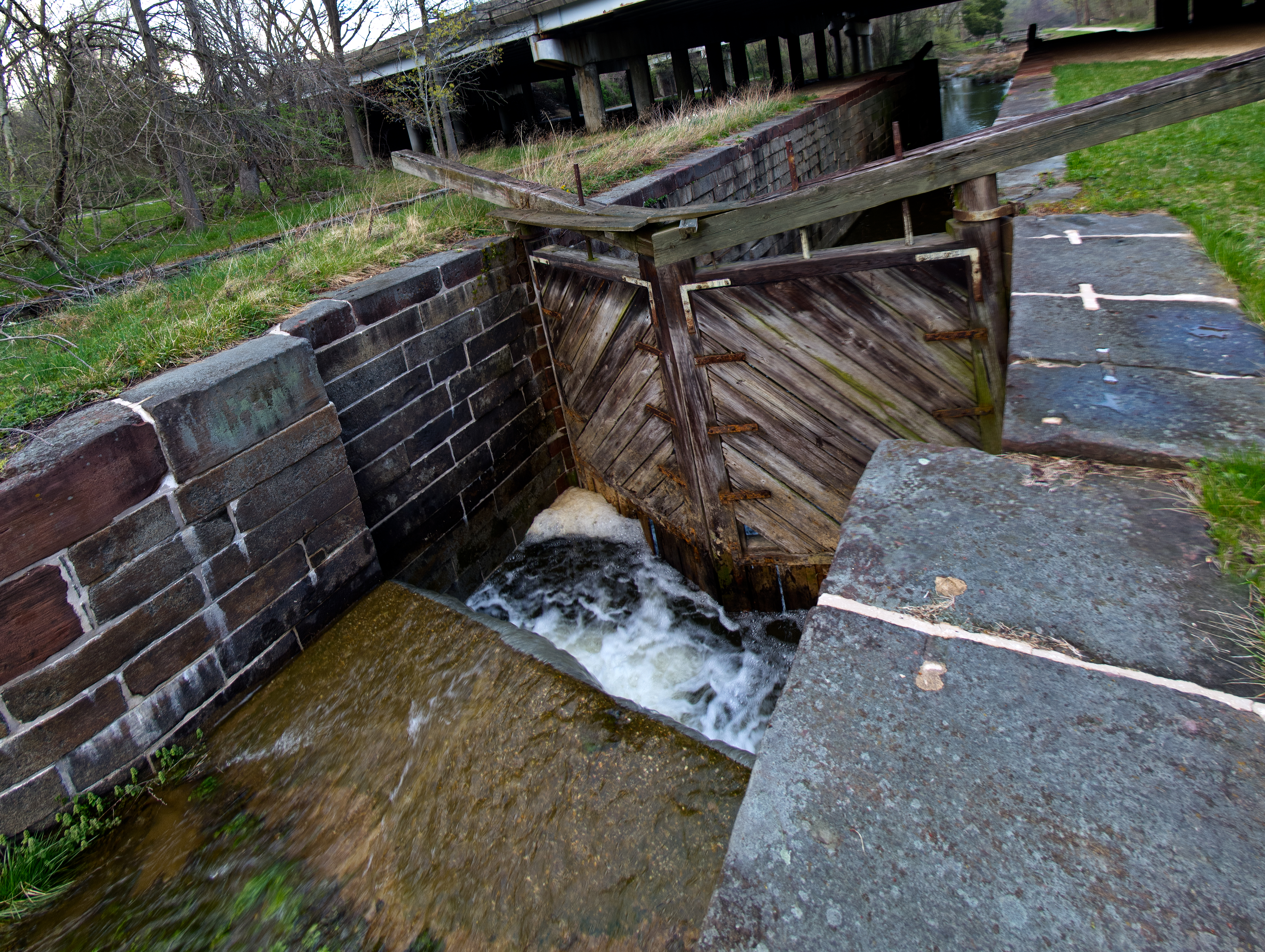
Here the upper gate is below the breast wall, and there is no wicket in the lock masonry, i.e. the recess where the upper gate fits in (Lock 13).

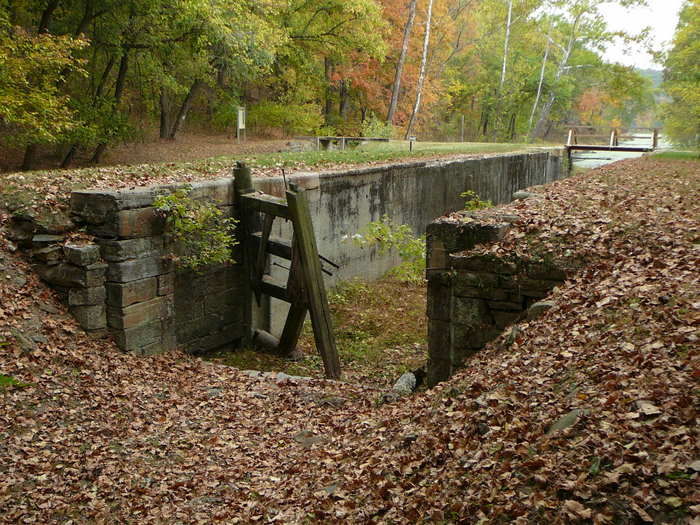
Another example of the upper gate below the breast wall. Again, no wicket in the lock masonry (Lock 58).

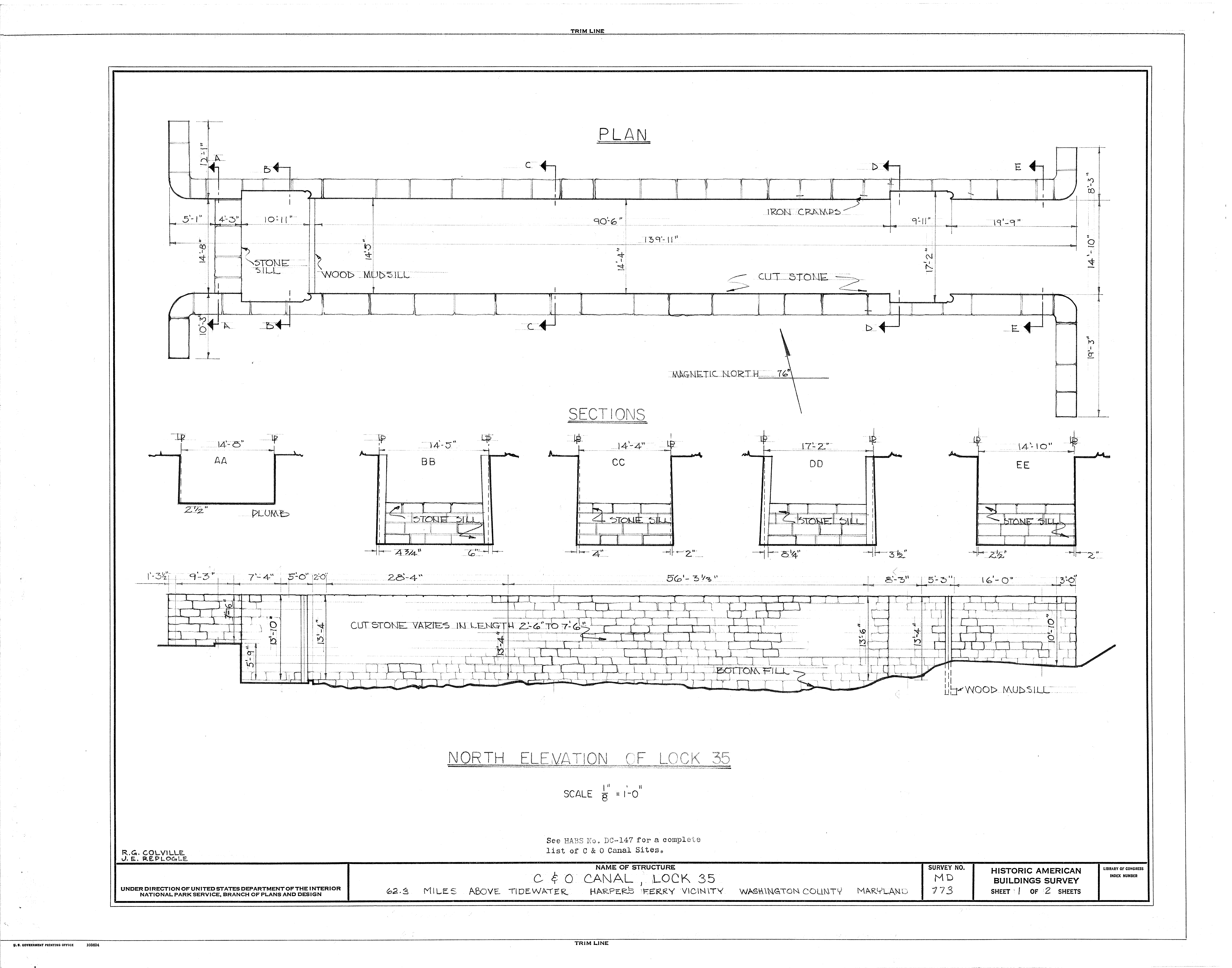
Drawing of an 1830 design lock (from HABS), here Lock #35 (Sharpsburg). Note how in the drawing, the gates are BELOW the breast wall, and there are no conduits in the masonry.

The 1830 design eliminated the use of culverts in the masonry, and the upper gate is below the breast wall. The advantage here is that the lock can fill faster with the wickets being in the gate, but will not swamp a boat in the lock chamber. In the 1830 design locks, the upper and lower gates are both the same height. The majority of locks on the C&O canal are to this specification.

Having the wickets in the gates, particularly if the gates are above the breast wall, means that the water pouring in could swamp some boats in the lock. Filling the lock through culverts eliminated that problem, as well as putting the lock gate below the breast wall.

Lock 27 is a curious combination of the two specifications, having the culverts inside the masonry, but the upper gate below the breast wall. This is because of multiple contractors working on the lock after a lapse of time.

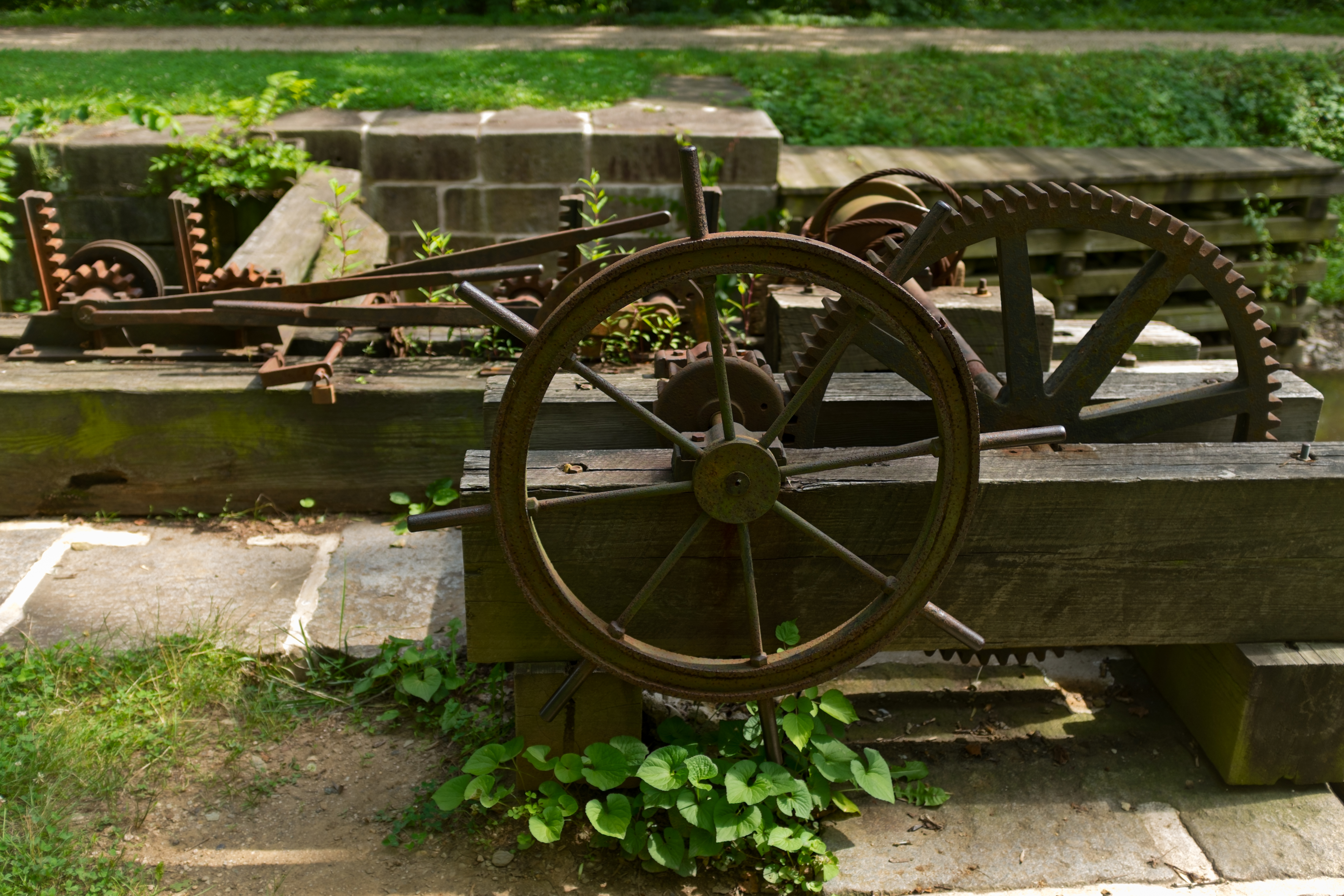
Drop lock mechanism on Lock 10 (Seven Locks)

Most locks were fitted with V gates, but some locks, particularly around Seven Locks (7, 9, 10, and 12), and also all three North Branch locks (Locks 73–75 ), were re-fitted with mechanical drop gates to speed up traffic in those areas. (Note that lock 6 had been converted to a drop gate, and later converted back to a V gate.) With the mechanical locks, a lever pulls a rod which connects to a crank, connected to another rod which turned the wicket valve which was in the floor (below where the gate would rest when opened) and water flows below the floor and into the lock. Hahn states this brought the time to lock through from about 10 minutes to around 3 minutes.

==== Lock cramps ====
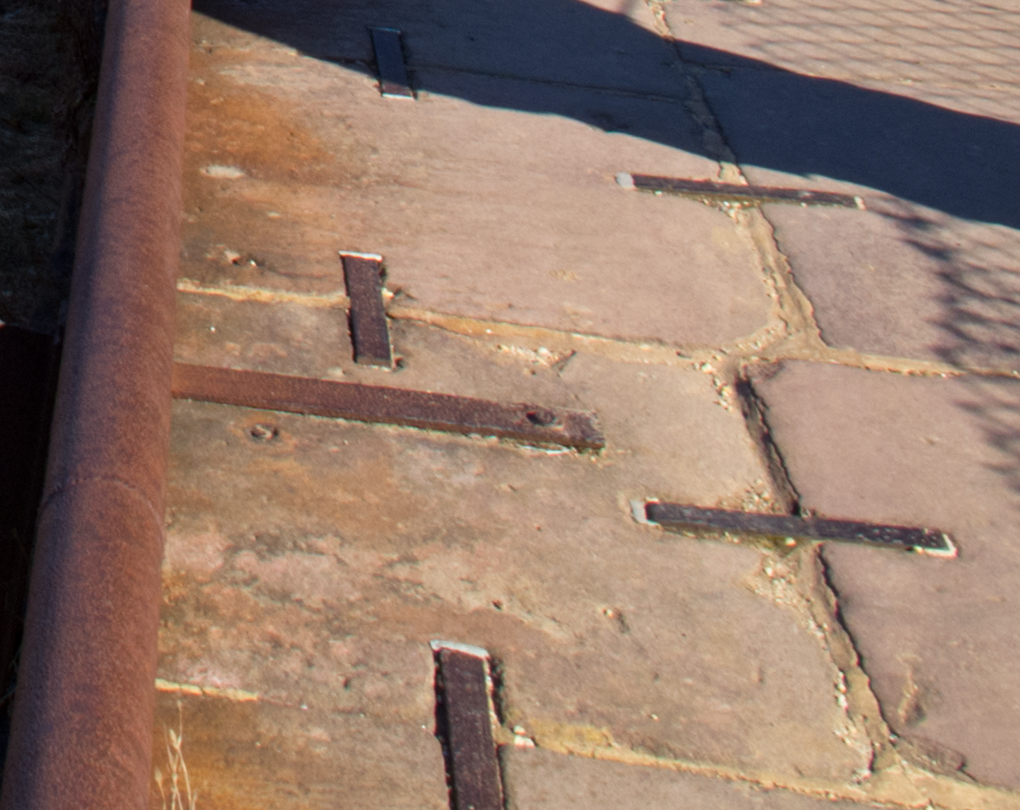
Example of iron cramps used to hold together the stones of Lock 24 (Riley's Lock)

There were three different periods (or kinds) of iron cramps (like staples) to hold the lock stones together. First is 1/2 inch x 1 1/2 inches x 13 inches long, later 1/2 inch x 2 inches x 13–14 inches long, and later, 1 inch round iron, and 1/2 inch into the stone.

==== Double locks ====
In 1875, the company decided to experiment with double boats (one boat tied to another, pulled by a team of mules) allowing them to decrease freight costs by 50%. The company extended 14 locks to do so. Locks 25 through 32 were extended for that reason. 11 locks were extended at the lower end (like Lock 25) and 3 were extended at the upper end, for a total of 14 extended locks on the canal. While since that time the stones from the downstream extensions have often been removed, the early mule rise (i.e. the towpath rise before the lock appears 120 feet earlier than normal) indicates the locks extended at the lower end. Lander Lock (No. 29) is a good example of this. While physical evidence shows that locks 25, 27, 29–33, 37, 38, 43, & 60 also were lengthened, Canal records only mention locks 5-7 being lengthened

In May 1864, those who tended these double locks wanted higher pay for them, but were unsuccessful. As a result, one of the lockkeepers, S. C. Rogers, abandoned his post (Locks 45–46) in protest, and was replaced by Obadiah Barger. Later in November 1864, Obadiah complained that he had been removed as locktender of the same locks (45–46) without just cause, and the locktender Susan Newcomer was never present but hired a youth without approval of the company, to tend the locks. After an investigation showed it to be true, she was sacked and Obadiah was reinstated as locktender again.

==== Lock tender's shanty ====
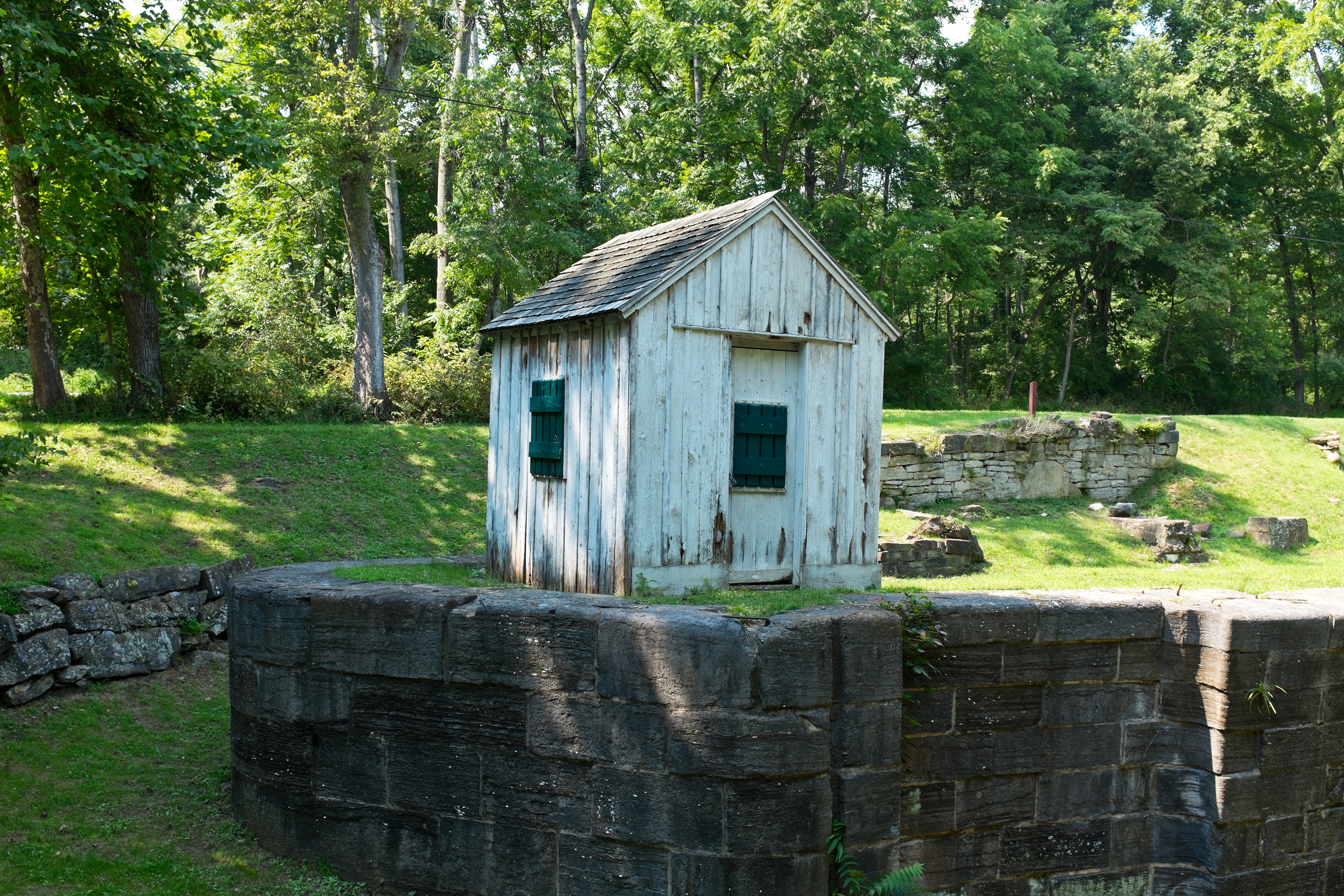
A lock tender's shanty, at Lock 50

It was quite common to build a little shanty so that the lockkeeper could look for boats coming, especially during the night or inclement weather.

==== Increase in depth ====
Some locks were increased in depth (Lock 25, 22, etc. for instance) by bolting timbers to the top of the lock. Some of those bolts are still in the stonework. This was apparently done because of silting in the canal necessitating raising the water level.

=== Bypass flumes ===
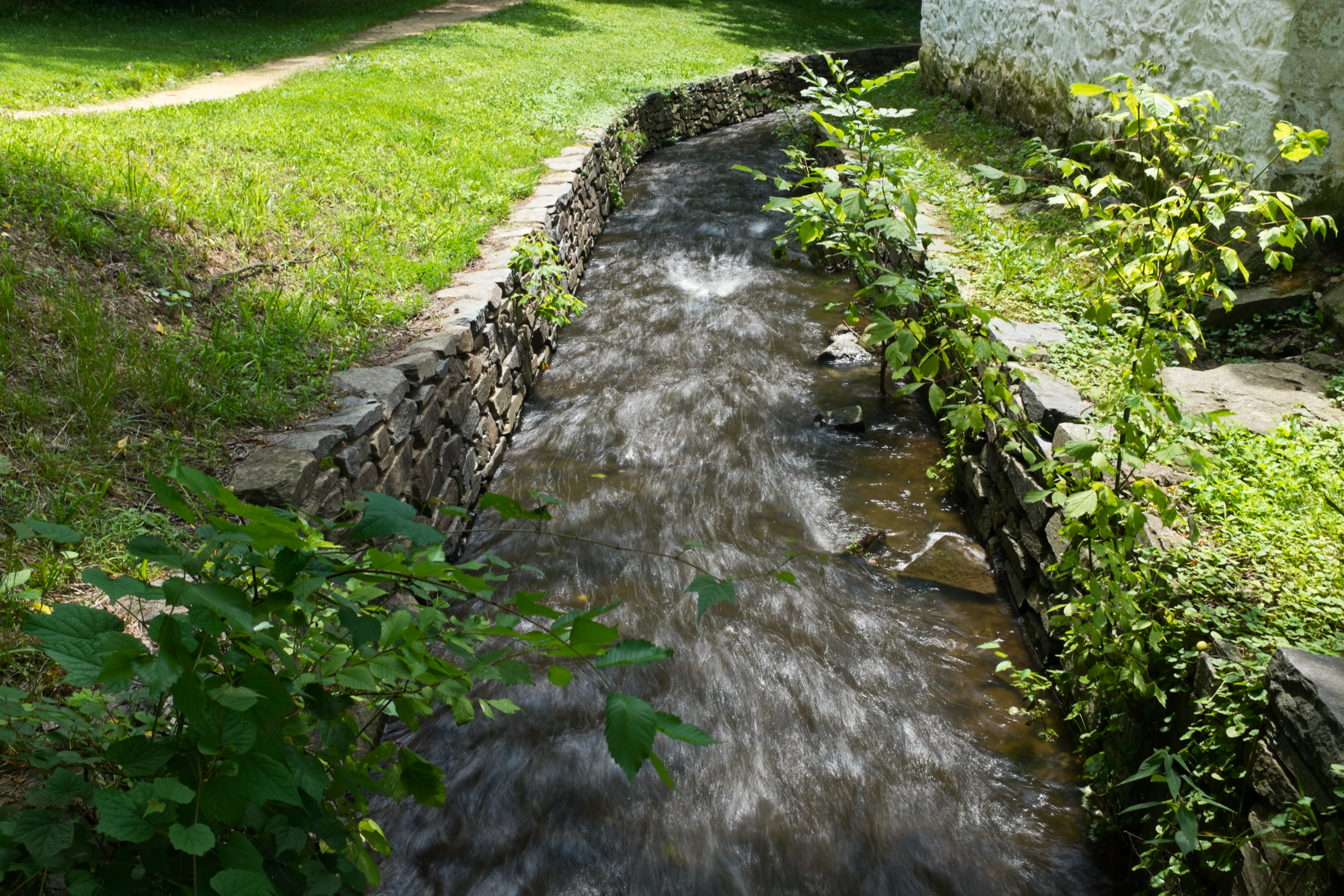
The bypass flume around Lock 7

Most locks have a bypass flume, which allows water to bypass the lock to water the level below. If the flume was covered over with concrete, that generally meant that a roadway passed over the lock. Originally the locks 1-27, with the possible exception of Lock 13 did not have bypass flumes, using the culverts to divert water, but later the bypass flumes were put in (which is what we see today).

=== Composite locks ===
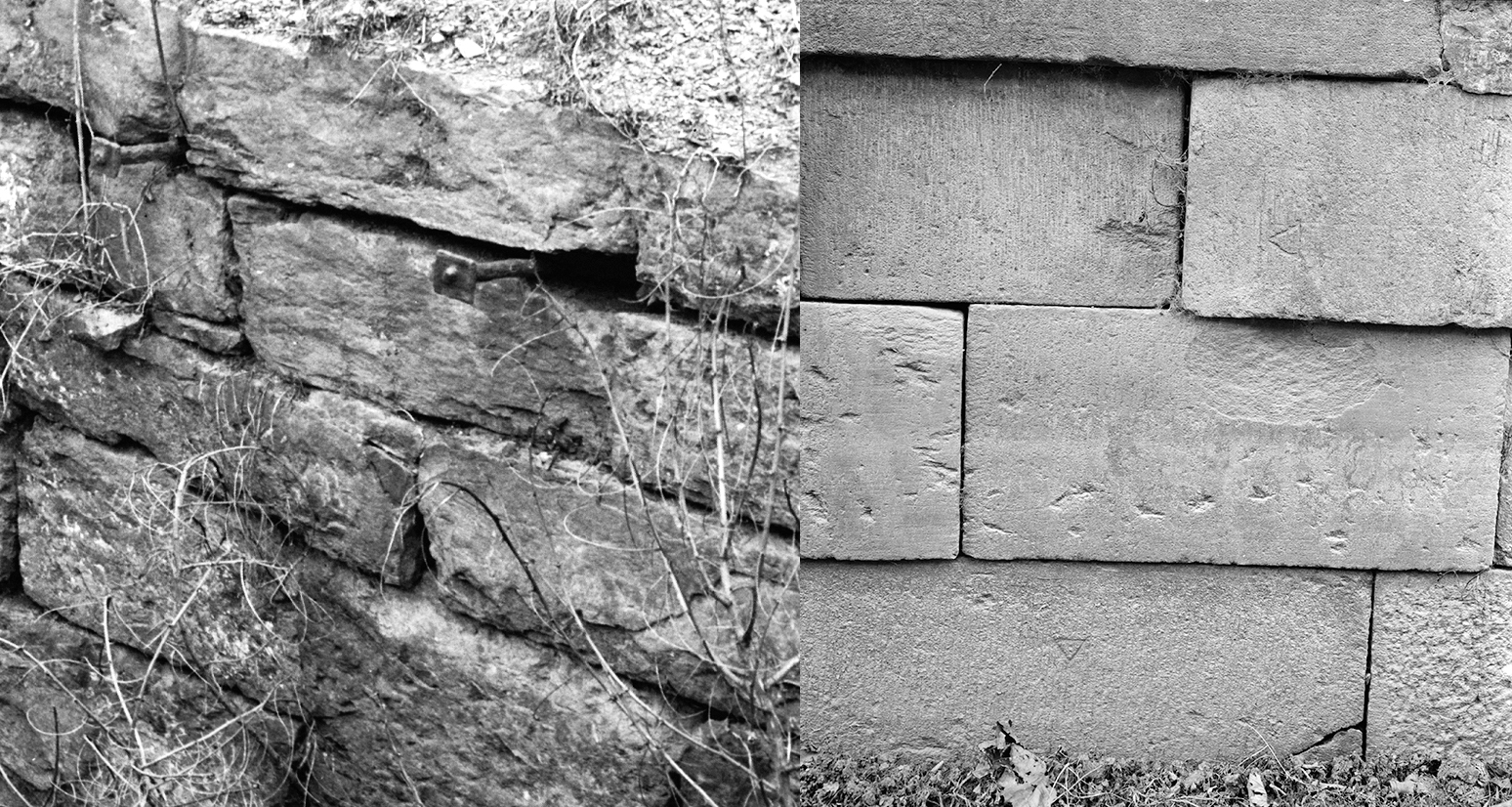
Rough stonework of a composite lock (L) vs smooth stonework of a regular lock (R). Note iron bolt (L) which would hold the wood lining.

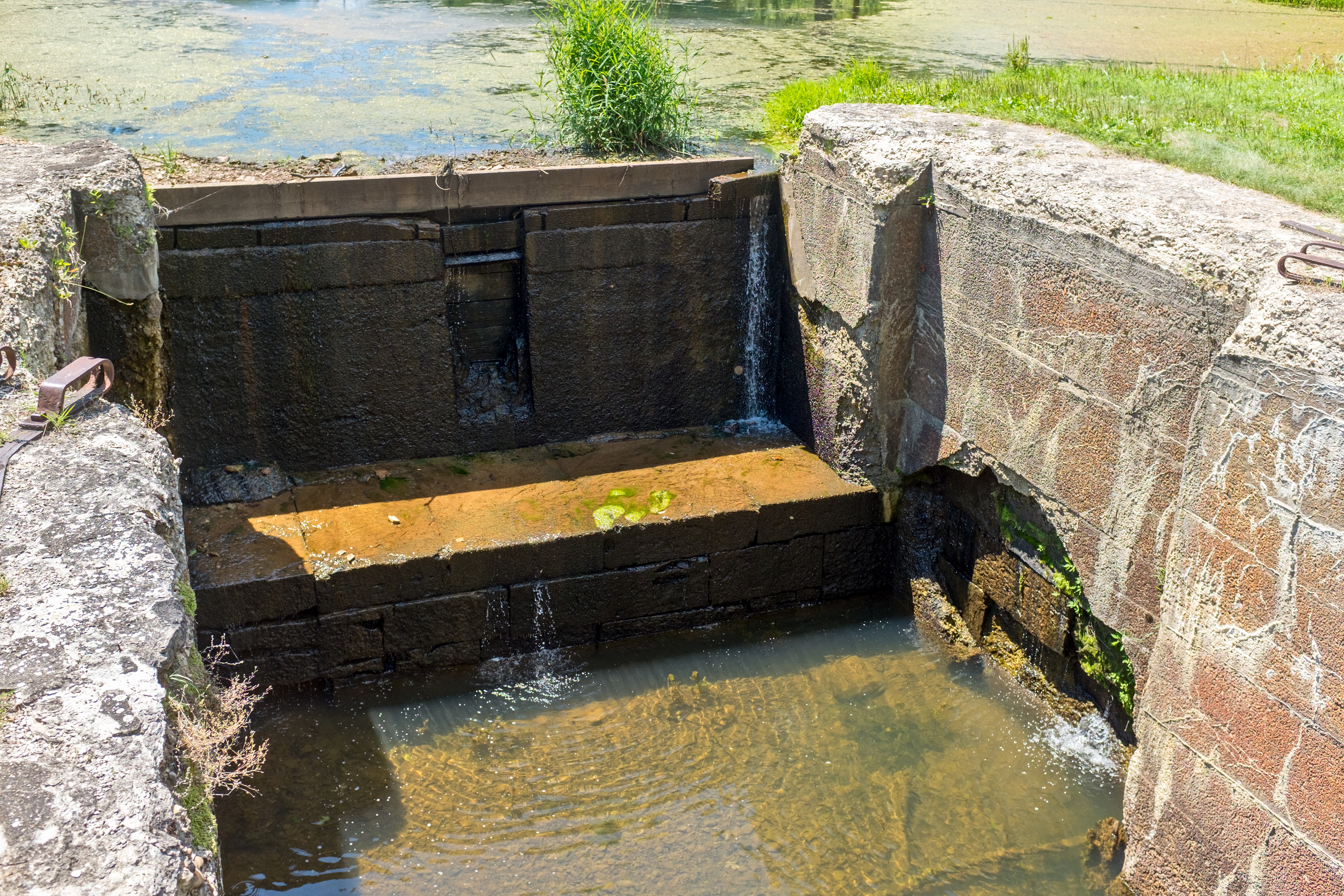
Example of concrete lined composite lock (#70). Lining is broken showing stonework behind. Original gates are missing.

Locks 58-71 are composite locks. Because there was a scarcity of good building stone in the upper Potomac, they made those locks of rubble and undressed inferior stone. Since the stone was undressed, that made a rougher surface, so the interior of the lock had to be lined with wood so as not to damage the boats in the lock. The wood sheathing had to be replaced from time to time. Originally kyanized wood was used.

Ellwood Morris, the Assistant Engineer, suggested using cement instead of stone for the locks to cut cost. On September 25, 1938, Charles B Fisk, the chief engineer, wrote to the board recommending the use of composite locks, such as those already found on the Chenango Canal. Chief Engineer Charles Fisk was the one who prevailed on the board of directors to remove Lock 65. This resulted in the numbering of fractional locks 63 1/3 and 64 2/3, so that the numbering above Lock 65 (now eliminated) could be preserved.

On 1 June 1870, Engineer W R Hunton reported that the composite locks were serviceable but not in good condition, with coping out of place, and leaks due to lack of mortar. Some of the locks were rebuilt in 1873–74.

By 1886-1888 the locks were in bad shape and in need of repair or rebuilding. Around 1910, because of problems, the wood was replaced with cement (which is often what is seen today). Some of that was because it was impractical to line the gate pockets with wood.

Locks 66, 64 2/3 and 63 1/3 have a 10-foot lift instead of the regulation 8-foot lift.

=== Lock names ===
Some of the locks were also informally named, usually after a prominent lockkeeper, a nearby town or important geographical feature. Some locks are known by more than one name and some are only known by their number. The names of the lockkeepers changed over the years, and the nicknames also changed. For instance Lock 21 had many lockkeepers: Mr. Fuller (1830), Mrs Susan Cross (1836), Robert C Fields (1839, Fired on 1 May 1846), Samuel Fisher (1846, 1851), and Jesse Swain (1924), hence today the lock is known as "Swain's Lock". The Swain family had been involved with the canal ever since its construction: John Swain helped build the canal; his sons John, Hen, and Bill Swain were boatmen as well as Jesse Swain (boatman and later locksman), and his son, Otho Swain.

Darbey's lock or Darkey's lock was named after Hughey Darkey, who had four or five red-headed girls.

Twigg's lock (69) was named after the Twigg family, one of the first settlers in the upper Potomac. John and Rebecca Twigg who settled there in the mid-1700s had two sons, Robert and Fleetwood John Twigg because of whom a Romeo and Juliet like story (without the tragedy at the end) ensued. Fleetwood John got himself an Indian maiden, and was rejected, so he built his house on the "other side of the pond". The "Blue Eyed Twiggs" (Robert's children) were not allowed to play with "Black Eyed Twiggs" (descended from F. John), and the feud continued for a few generations until a "Blue Eyed Twigg" fell in love with a "Black Eyed Twigg".

Many of the locktenders who were of good reputation, were later promoted to district superintendent. These included Elgin and John Y. Young in the 1830s and 1840s, John Lambie in the 1840s. A. K. Stake began at locks 41–41 from 1847 to 1848, Lewis G. Stanhop at locks 41–42 also in 1848, and Overton G. Lowe at Lock 56 when the canal opened to Cumberland – these three individuals were later promoted and continued working for the Canal company well into the 1870s.

=== Incidents ===
There were plenty of incidents with negligent lockkeepers. On September 11, 1895, at Lock 22, the boat Excelsior arrived, and tried to lock through. The lockkeeper was drunk, and opened the lower gate paddles too early. The boat hit the mitre sill, broke in half, and sank with its 113 tons of coal. Richard A. Moore, the owner of the boat, collected over $1,300 in damages, and the lockkeeper was fired.

=== List of locks ===
The date is the date when the lock was completed. It often took a year to build the lock, and about $10,000. The lift (in feet) of a lock is listed when known. The locks ranged from 6-foot lift to a 10-foot lift, 8-foot being the most common. Specific information about lock dimensions, materials used, design, etc. can be found in William Davies's book.

Lock	Miles	Name	Nearby landmarks	Coordinates	Date	Lift	Photo
0	0.0	Tidewater Lock		38.900°N 77.058°W	1831	3.5	
1	0.38		Georgetown	38.904°N 77.058°W	Apr 1831	8	
2	0.42		Georgetown	38.904°N 77.059°W	Apr 1831	8	
3	0.49		Georgetown	38.904°N 77.059°W	Apr 1831	8	
4	0.54		Georgetown	38.904°N 77.061°W	Apr 1831	8	
5	5.0	Brookmont Lock & Inlet #1	Brookmont	38.940°N 77.122°W	Sept 1830	8	
6	5.4	Magazine Lock	Little Falls	38.945°N 77.124°W	Sept 1830	8	
7	7.0	Chataqua Lock	Glen Echo	38.965°N 77.139°W	Sept 1829	8	
8	8.33	Seven Locks 1		38.971°N 77.161°W	July 1830	8	
9	8.7	Seven Locks 2		38.972°N 77.167°W	Sept 1830	8	
10	8.79	Seven Locks 3		38.972°N 77.169°W	Sept 1830	8	
11	8.97	Seven Locks 4		38.972°N 77.172°W	July 1830	8	
12	9.29	Seven Locks 5		38.972°N 77.178°W	Aug 1830	8	
13	9.37	Seven Locks 6	American Legion (Cabin John) Bridge	38.972°N 77.179°W	Sept 1830	(8)	
14	9.47	Seven Locks 7		38.972°N 77.181°W	Sept 1830	(8)	
15	13.45	Six Locks 1	Great Falls	38.989°N 77.244°W	July 1829	8	
16	13.60	Six Locks 2	Great Falls	38.992°N 77.245°W	July 1829	8	
17	13.99	Six Locks 3	Great Falls	38.996°N 77.248°W	July 1830	8	
18	14.09	Six Locks 4	Great Falls	38.998°N 77.249°W	July 1830	8	
19	14.17	Six Locks 5	Great Falls	38.999°N 77.248°W	Nov 1830	9	
20	14.30	Six Locks 6 - a.k.a. Tavern Lock	Great Falls Tavern	39.000°N 77.248°W	July 1830	8	
21	16.64	Swains Lock	Travilah, Maryland	39.032°N 77.244°W	Oct 1830	8	
22	19.63	Pennyfield Lock	Dierssen Wildlife Management Area	39.054°N 77.289°W	May 1831	7	
23	22.12	Violette's Lock and Inlet Lock 2		39.067°N 77.329°W	Jan 1831	8½	
24	22.76	Riley's Lock	Seneca Aqueduct; Seneca Quarry	39.069°N 77.340°W	Mar 1832	8½	
25	30.8	Edward's Ferry	Poolesville	39.103°N 77.472°W	Oct 1831	8½	
26	39.4	Wood's Lock		39.216°N 77.458°W	Aug 1832	8	
27	41.5	Spinks Ferry	Monocacy Aqueduct	39.191°N 77.471°W	June 1832	8	
28	48.9	Fulton's Lock, Dent's Lock	Point of Rocks	39.282°N 77.548°W	July 1832	6	
29	50.89	Lander Lock or Catoctin Lock		39.307°N 77.559°W	April 1834	7	
30	55.0		Brunswick, Maryland	39.311°N 77.630°W	Oct 1833	8	
31	58.0	Weverton Lock		39.329°N 77.681°W	Sept 1833	8	
32	60.23		Sandy Hook, Maryland	39.324°N 77.719°W	July 1833	8	
33	60.7		Harper's Ferry	39.325°N 77.727°W	Sept 1833	8	
34	61.57	Goodheart's Lock	Harper's Ferry	39.333°N 77.739°W	Nov 1833	8	
35	62.33		Harper's Ferry	39.337°N 77.751°W	Oct 1834	8	
36	62.44		Harper's Ferry	39.337°N 77.753°W	Nov 1834	8	
37	66.96	Mountain Lock		39.385°N 77.735°W	Aug 1833	9	
38	72.65	Shepherdstown Lock	Shepherdstown, West Virginia	39.435°N 77.798°W	Sept 1833	5	
39	74.0	One Mile Lock	James Rumsey Bridge, Snyder's Landing	39.446°N 77.783°W	Sept 1834	6	
40	79.41		Horseshoe Bend	39.486°N 77.779°W	July 1834	9	
41	88.9		Above Big Slackwater	39.533°N 77.838°W	Dec 1834	10	
42	89.04		Above Big Slackwater	39.532°N 77.840°W	Dec 1834	9	
43	92.96			39.542°N 77.866°W	Jan 1835	9	
44	99.3	Williamsport	Williamsport, Maryland	39.594°N 77.825°W	Nov 1834	10	
45	107.27	Two Locks 1	Reentry to canal above Little Slackwater	39.614°N 77.926°W	Nov 1836	7	
46	107.42	Two Locks 2		39.616°N 77.927°W	Nov 1838	7	
47	108.8	Four Locks 1		39.617°N 77.947°W	Nov 1837	8¼	
48	108.8	Four Locks 2		39.616°N 77.948°W	May 1838	8¼	
49	108.8	Four Locks 3		39.615°N 77.949°W	May 1838	8¼	
50	108.8	Four Locks 4	Beginning of 14 mile level	39.614°N 77.949°W	May 1838	8¼	
51	122.59	Hancock 1	Hancock, Maryland	39.693°N 78.151°W	Apr 1838	8	
52	122.85	Hancock 2	Hancock, Maryland	39.694°N 78.156°W	Apr 1839	8	
53	130.0	Irishman's Lock	Leopard's Mill	39.651°N 78.241°W	Jan 1837	8	
54	134.0			39.624°N 78.289°W	1849	7.8	
55	134.0		Near Dam 6	39.625°N 78.292°W	Oct 1840	7.8	
56	136.2	Sideling Lock	Sideling Hill	39.637°N 78.329°W	1849	7.7	
57	139.2			39.627°N 78.361°W	Mar 1840	8	
58	143.9			39.621°N 78.406°W	1850	8	
59	146.6			39.611°N 78.433°W	Sept 1850	8	
60	149.7		Stickpile Hill	39.582°N 78.404°W	Sept 1850	8.385	
61	153.1			39.584°N 78.460°W	Aug 1850	8	
62	154.2			39.571°N 78.453°W	Aug 1850	10	
63 1/3	154.5		Paw Paw Tunnel	39.567°N 78.454°W	Aug 1850	10	
64 2/3	154.6			39.566°N 78.455°W	Aug 1850	10	
66	154.7			39.565°N 78.457°W	Aug 1850	10	
67	161.8	Darbey's Lock		39.525°N 78.533°W	1850	8	
68	164.8	Crabtree's Lock		39.530°N 78.589°W	1850	8.258	
69	166.4	Twigg's Lock		39.540°N 78.608°W	1850	8	
70	166.7	Oldtown		39.540°N 78.612°W	1850	8	
71	167.0			39.541°N 78.618°W	1850	8	
72	174.4	The Narrows or Ten Mile Lock		39.575°N 78.730°W	Nov 1841	9	
73	175.4	North Branch 1		39.588°N 78.736°W	Dec 1840	9	
74	175.5	North Branch 2		39.588°N 78.738°W	Mar 1841	10	
75	175.6	North Branch 3 or Keifers Lock		39.587°N 78.741°W	Aug 1840	10	
	184.5	End of the canal	Cumberland, Maryland	39.649°N 78.763°W			

== Stop gates ==
There were a number of stop gates throughout the canal, e.g. between lock 16 and lock 17, on section 17. For some reason, the list Unrau has does not list that lock. The others are listed by section number along the canal, but he did not provide a list of where the section numbers correspond to mileage numbers along the canal. Note that the greatest number of stop gates were between Lock 50 and 51, that is the 14 mile level which includes Big Pool. There are stop gates both before and after Big pool.

To add to the confusion, some of the locks, such as lock 33, had provisions to put in boards as a stop gate at the top of the lock. Lift locks with such provisions are not listed here.

Section	Miles	Nearby landmarks	Coordinates	Date	Photo
C	2.18	Georgetown, just downstream of the inclined plane. Visible when water is low. Remains on towpath side only, berm side is gone.		April 1837	
17	13.7	Great Falls.	38.993271°N 77.245146°W	1852	
38	24	Was between Locks 24 and 25. Davies reported "There are no remains of it"		March 1836	
156	84.4	At Dam #4	39.495795°N 77.826631°W	April 1839	
195	102.5	Was between Locks 44 and 45. Davies reports "No evidence of it remains today"		May 1835	
209	110.29	Above Lock 50		June 1839	
213	112	Between locks 50 and 51 Below Big Pool	39.605482°N 78.005044°W	July 1838	
217	114.15	Between locks 50 and 51 Above Big Pool		Feb 1839	
228	119.71	Between locks 50 and 51		June 1839	

== See also ==
- Canal Place, Cumberland
