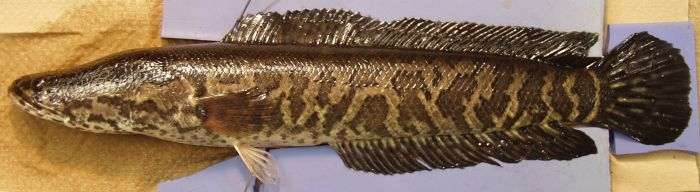

Conservation status
- Least Concern (IUCN 3.1)

Scientific classification
- Kingdom: Animalia
- Phylum: Chordata
- Class: Actinopterygii
- Division: Teleostei
- Order: Anabantiformes
- Family: Channidae
- Genus: Channa
- Species: C. argus

Binomial name
- Channa argus (Cantor, 1842)
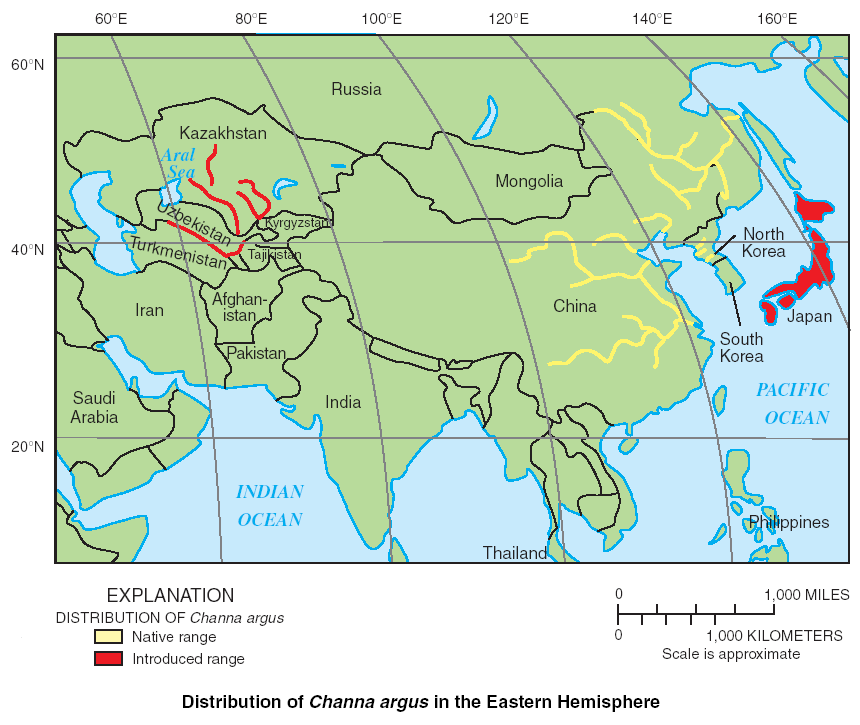
- Asian distribution of Channa argus (native in yellow, introduced in red). Source: USGS 2004

Synonyms
- Ophicephalus argus Cantor, 1842; Ophicephalus argus (Cantor, 1842); Ophicephalus pekinensis Basilewsky, 1855; Ophiocephalus warpachowskii Berg, 1909

= Northern snakehead =

Species of fish

The northern snakehead also known as Chesapeake Channa (Channa argus) in Maryland U.S is a species of snakehead fish native to temperate East Asia, in China, Russia, North Korea, and South Korea. Their natural range goes from the Amur River watershed in Siberia and Manchuria down to Hainan. It is an important food fish and one of the most cultivated in its native region, with 510,000 tonnes annual production worldwide. Due to this, the northern snakehead has been exported throughout the world and has managed to establish non-native populations in Central Asia and North America. In the United States, it is found in Pennsylvania, Virginia, West Virginia, Delaware, Maryland, North Carolina, Arkansas, Missouri, and Mississippi.

== Appearance ==
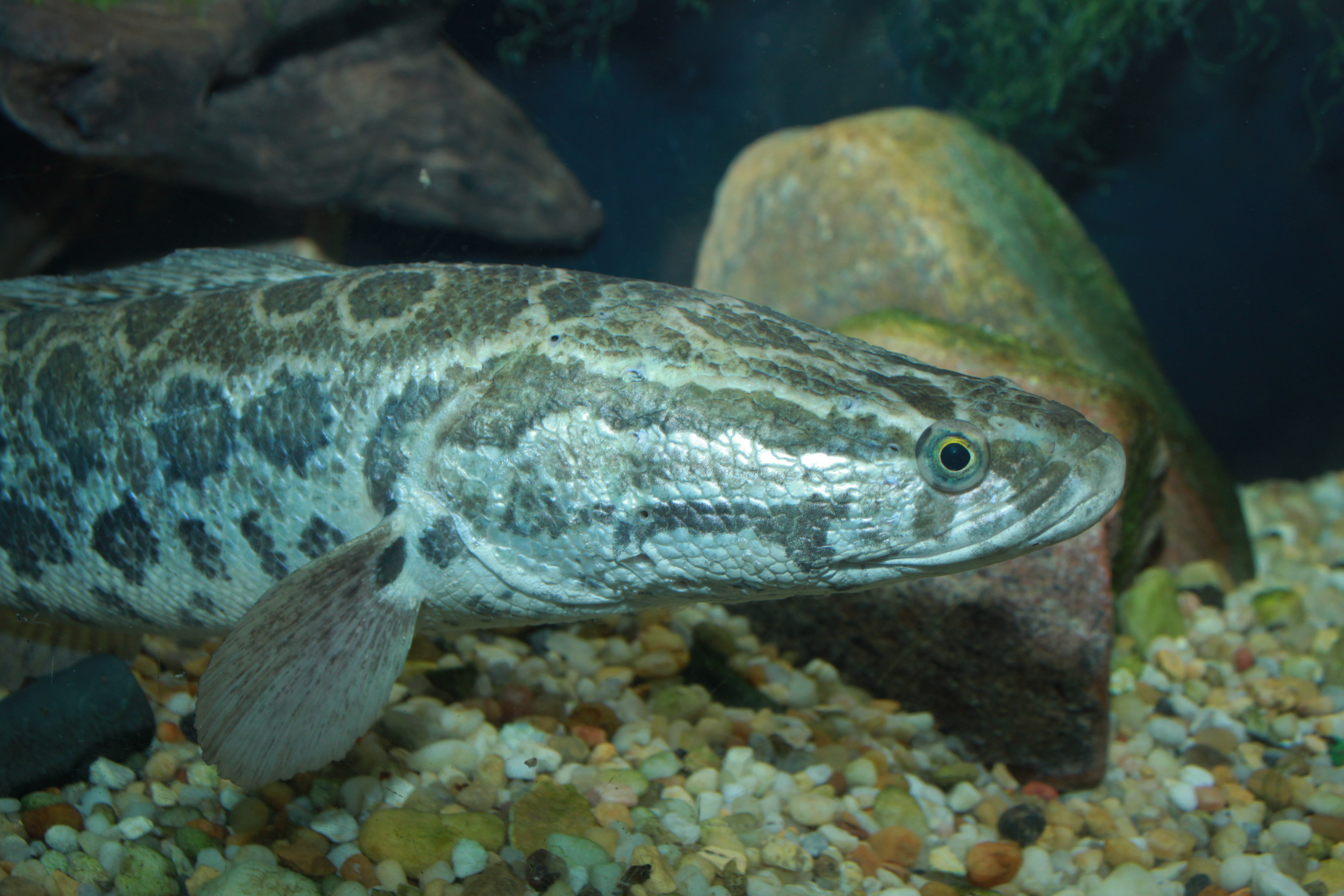
Head of a northern snakehead

The distinguishing features of a northern snakehead include a long dorsal fin with 49–50 rays, an anal fin with 31–32 rays, a small, anteriorly depressed head, the eyes above the middle part of the upper jaw, a large mouth extending well beyond the eye, and villiform teeth in bands, with large canines on the lower jaw and palatines. It is generally reported to reach a length up to 100 cm (3 ft 3 in), but specimens approaching 150 cm (4 ft 11 in) are known according to Russian ichthyologists. The largest registered by the International Game Fish Association weighs 9.53 kg (21 lb 0 oz).

Its coloration is a golden tan to pale brown, with dark blotches on the sides and saddle-like blotches across the back. Blotches toward the front tend to separate between top and bottom sections, while rear blotches are more likely to be contiguous. Coloration is nearly the same between juveniles and adults, which is unusual among snakeheads, and is similar to Channa maculata, but can be distinguished by two bar-like marks on the caudal peduncle (where the tail attaches); in C. maculata, the rear bar is usually complete, with pale bar-like areas before and after, while in C. argus, the rear bar is irregular and blotched, with no pale areas around it.

=== Fish similar in appearance ===
The eyespot bowfin (Amia ocellicauda) and northern snakehead can be found in the same waters on the swampy tidal coastal plain of the mid-Atlantic United States, such as the Potomac and Delaware River, and are commonly confused with each other. Some contrasting differences in northern snakehead include the lack of a black eyespot on their caudal peduncle, a golden tan to brown coloration with dark splotches, a longer anal fin, a more elongated head, and an upper jaw that is shorter than its lower jaw. Another noticeable difference is that the northern snakehead has scales that continue uniformly from the body through to their head, whereas bowfin heads are smooth and free of scales.

== Behavior ==
The northern snakehead is a freshwater fish and cannot tolerate salinity in excess of 10 parts per million. It is a facultative air breather, using a suprabranchial organ and a bifurcated ventral aorta that permit both aquatic and aeria respiration. This unusual respiratory system allows it to live outside of water for several days. As an amphibious fish, it can wriggle its way between bodies of water or survive being transported by humans. Only young members of this species (not adults) may be able to move overland for short distances using wriggling motions. The preferred habitats of this species are stagnant water with mud substrate and aquatic vegetation, or slow, murky, swampy streams; it is primarily piscivorous, but is known to eat crustaceans, other invertebrates, and amphibians.

== Reproduction ==
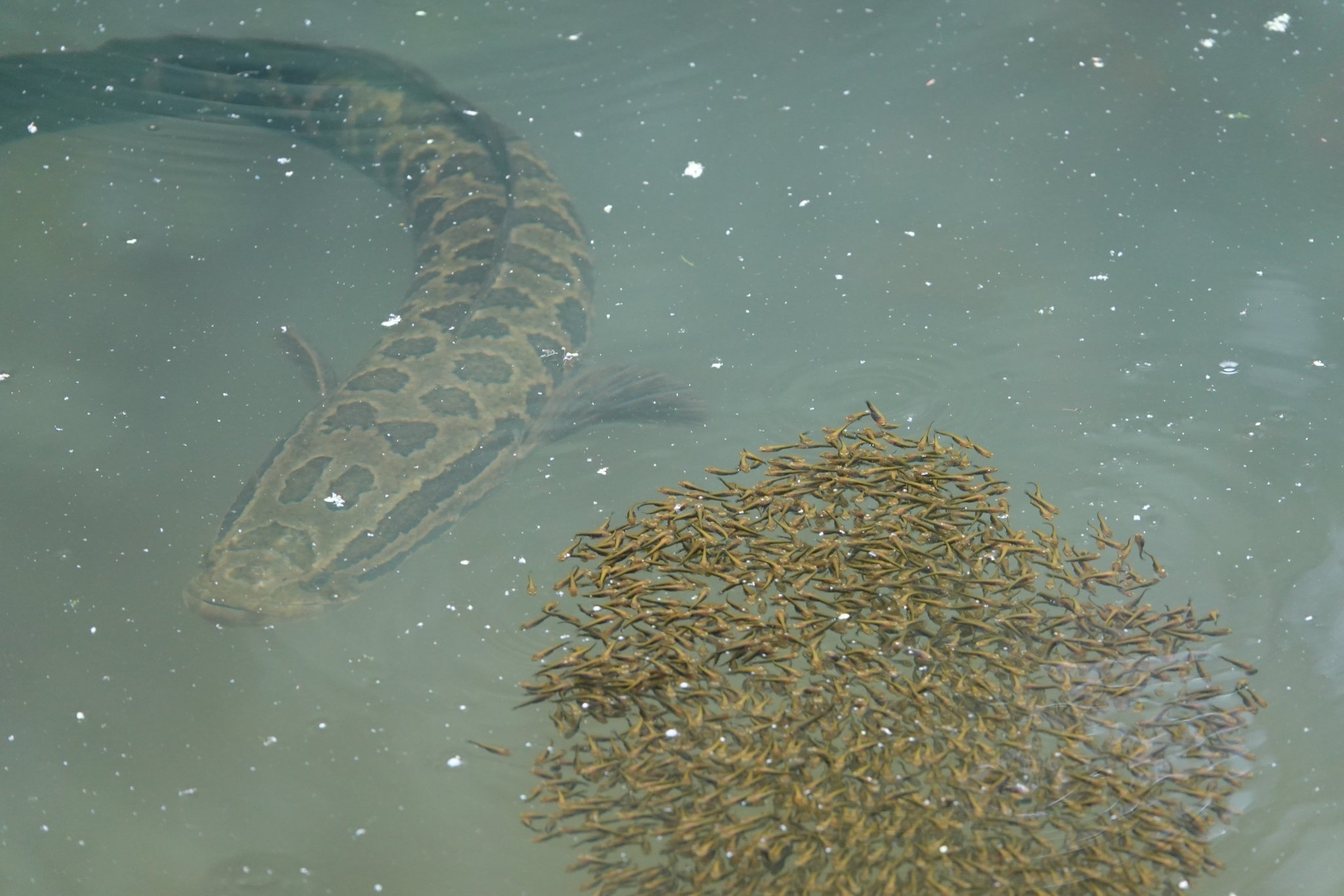
A northern snakehead with its fry at Swains Lock on the Potomac River

The northern snakehead can double its population in as little as 15 years. It reaches sexual maturity at age three or four, when it will be about 30 to 35 cm (1 ft 0 in – 1 ft 2 in) long. The eggs are fertilized externally; a female can lay 100,000 eggs a year. Fertilization occurs in shallow water in the early morning. The eggs are yellow and spherical, about 2 mm (0.079 in) in diameter. Eggs hatch after about 1–2 days, but they can take much longer at lower temperatures. The eggs are guarded by the parents until egg absorption, when the eggs are about 8 mm (0.31 in) long.

== Subspecies ==
Two subspecies have been recognized:

- C. a. argus (Cantor, 1842) (Northern snakehead) China and Korea
- C. a. warpachowskii Berg, 1909 (Amur snakehead) eastern Russia.

== As an invasive species ==
In its native Asia, the snakehead fish is considered to be an important food fish and for this reason they have been exported to many other regions around the world. They were first introduced to Japan from mainland Asia in the early 1900s, where they have since become a sport fish. The USSR experimented with aquaculture of snakeheads during the mid 20th century in both Europe and Central Asia. In the United States, snakeheads were only cultured in Arkansas, but have managed to establish populations there and several states in the Mid-Atlantic.

=== Japan ===
Snakeheads of Korean stock were first introduced to Japan in the 1920s, and since then have spread to about every suitable body of water on the Japanese mainland.

=== Europe ===
During the Cold War, the USSR imported several different species of fish from eastern Eurasia into Europe for new prospects in aquaculture. Among these fish was the northern snakehead, which came from the Amur River basin and were stocked in various ponds of the Moscow region starting in 1949. These initial experiments were successful and it was recommended that snakehead be stocked into various other waterbodies. However, only one shipment to Czechoslovakia was ever made in 1955, and nothing else after. The snakehead was also introduced to the Volga Delta and various ponds in Yekaterinburg, but are presumed to have failed due to no reports since then.

While the snakeheads were reported to have been breeding in Moscow in the 1950s, they have since disappeared. There are no known populations in Europe in this moment.

In the European Union, it is included in the list of invasive alien species of Union concern and hence cannot be imported, bred, transported, commercialized, or intentionally released into the environment in any of its member states.

=== Central Asia ===
The snakehead has managed to establish themselves in the countries of Kazakhstan, Turkmenistan, and Uzbekistan, all of which used to be part of the former Soviet Union. More specifically, they are known to be in the Amu Darya, Syr Darya, and Kashka-Darya since the 1960s due to both accidental and intentional releases. Since then, snakeheads have also been introduced to the Sarysu River, Talas River, and Chu River. They have become an important commercial fish in the region, with around 10 metric tons being harvested from just the Talas in 1989.

=== United States ===
The fish first appeared in U.S. news when an alert fisherman discovered one in a Crofton, Maryland, pond in the summer of 2002. The northern snakehead was considered a threat to the Chesapeake Bay watershed, and wary officials took action by draining the pond in an attempt to destroy the species. The action was successful, and two adults and over 100 juvenile fish were found and destroyed. A man admitted having released two adults, which he had purchased from a New York City market, into the pond.

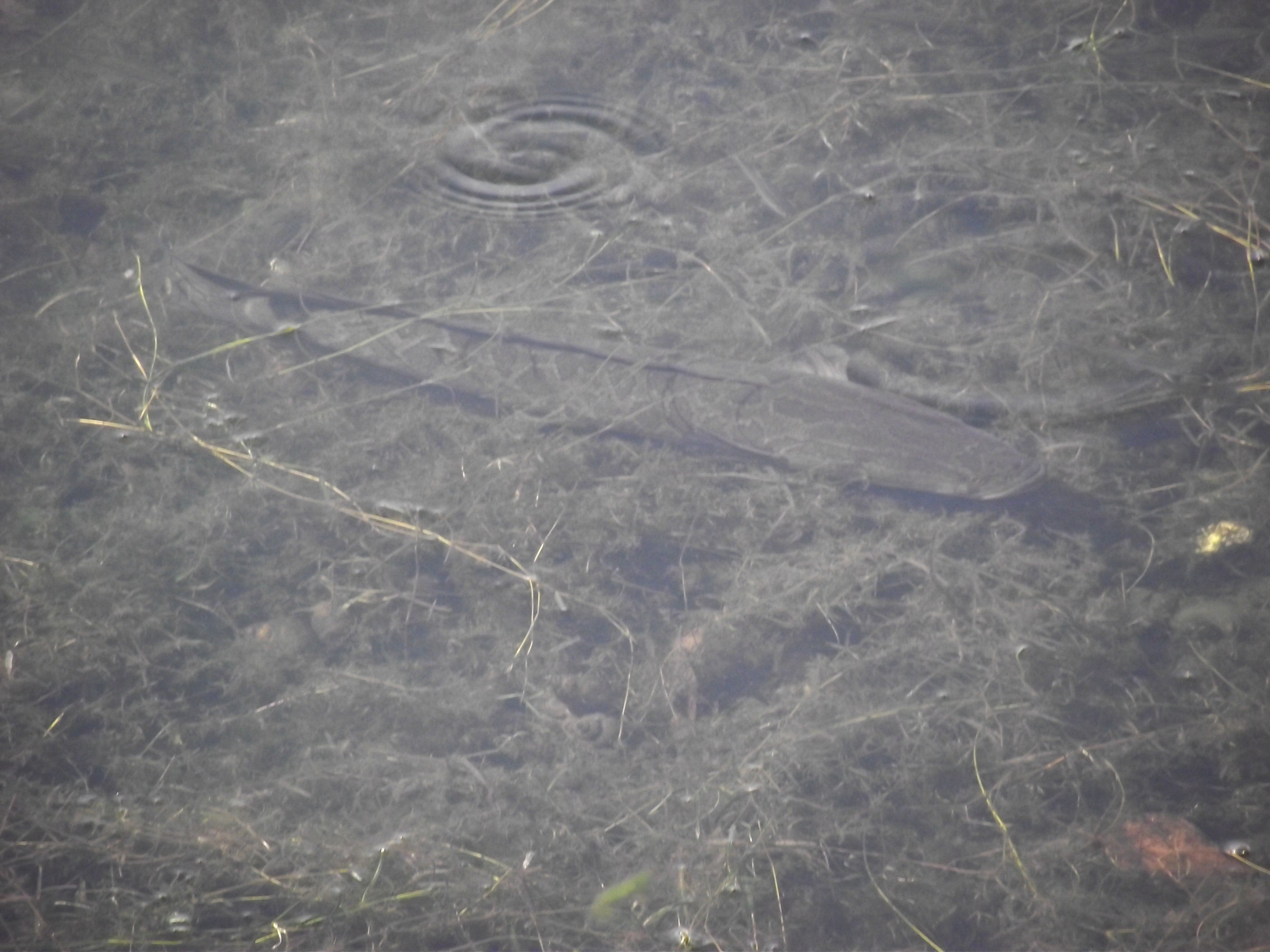
Northern snakehead in shallow water

When the northern snakehead was found in Crofton, the piscicide rotenone was added to the three adjacent ponds. The chemical breaks down rapidly, and has a half-life in water of one to three days. This method of containment kills all fish present in a body of water, and its use prevents the spread of the highly invasive snakehead.

In 2004, 19 northern snakeheads were captured in the Potomac River, and they were later confirmed to have become established (i.e., they were breeding). They are somewhat limited to that stretch of the river and its local tributaries, upstream by the Great Falls and downstream by the salinity of the Chesapeake Bay. Tests found they are not related to northern snakeheads found in other waters in the region, alleviating some concern of their overland migration. Northern snakeheads continue to be caught in the river as of 2022.

The northern snakehead has been found in three counties of Florida, and may already be established there. Apparently unestablished specimens have been found in Flushing Meadows–Corona Park in New York City, two ponds in Philadelphia, Pennsylvania, a pond in Massachusetts, and reservoirs in California and North Carolina. In 2008, the northern snakehead was found in drainage ditches in Arkansas as a result of a commercial fish-farming accident. Recent flooding may have allowed the species to spread into the nearby White River, which would allow an eventual population of the fish in the Arkansas River and Mississippi River.

In the summer of 2008, an infestation of the northern snakehead was confirmed in Ridgebury Lake and Catlin Creek near Ridgebury, New York. By August 2008, the New York State Department of Environmental Conservation (NYSDEC) had collected a number of the native fish, and then poisoned the waters with a liquid rotenone formulation. After the poisoning, the NYSDEC had to identify, measure, and additionally process the fish to adhere with New York Bureau of Fisheries procedures before disposal. The treatment plan was operated under several agents, and New York State Police were placed on stand-by in case of protests by local residents.

In April 2013, sightings of the species in Central Park's Harlem Meer prompted New York City officials to urge anglers to report and capture any individuals. Ron P. Swegman, author of several angling essays on Central Park's ponds, confirmed the species had put both anglers and the State of New York's Department of Environmental Protection on high alert.

On 1 June 2013, Caleb Newton, a resident of Spotsylvania County, Virginia, caught a 7.9 kg (17 lb 6 oz) northern snakehead from the junction of Aquia Creek and the Potomac River, beating the previous world record of 17 lb 4 oz (7.8 kg) caught in 2004, in Miki, Kagawa Prefecture, Japan.

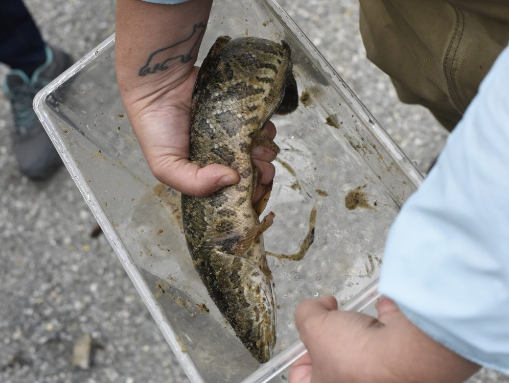
A captured northern snakehead.

In late 2013, authorities in Maryland and Virginia were counting snakeheads in the Chesapeake Bay to better understand the impact of the introduction of the fish to the local ecosystem. The Commonwealth of Virginia has criminalized the "introduc[tion]" of snakeheads into the state without specific authorization, although the relevant statute does not explain whether mere importation is sufficient to constitute "introduc[tion] into the Commonwealth" or whether instead release into the environment is required.

On May 20, 2014, Luis Aragon of Triangle, Virginia, caught a 17 lb 12 oz (8.05 kg) northern snakehead, which was officially listed as the biggest ever caught on rod and reel, according to the International Game Fish Association.

On May 20, 2016, Emory "Dutch" Baldwin of Indian Head, Maryland, boated an 18.42 lb (8.36 kg) northern snakehead in a tidal marsh of the Potomac using archery tackle. This fish was listed as the state sport record in Maryland by the Maryland Department of Natural Resources.

On the night of May 24, 2018, Andrew "Andy" Fox of Mechanicsville, Maryland, shot a northern snakehead with a bow and arrow, which was officially listed as the biggest ever shot according to the Maryland Department of Natural Resources. The record-breaking northern snakehead weighed 19.9 lb (9.0 kg), with a length of 35.157 inches (89.3 cm). The snakehead was shot in Mattawoman Creek in Charles County, Maryland, near Indian Head.

In October 2019, a number of northern snakeheads were found in a pond on private property in Gwinnett County, Georgia.

In August 2021, a 30-inch (76 cm) snakehead weighing 5 pounds (2.3 kg) was caught in a reservoir in Canton, Massachusetts.

In 2024 a snakehead was confirmed at the Duck Creek Conservation Area in southeast Missouri.

In August 2025 multiple snakehead have been caught in the Crosswicks Creek, New Egypt, New Jersey with a live sample being confirmed by the NJ DEP.

In July 2026 snakeheads were reported to be found in a reservoir ponds in southern Rhode Island confirmed by the Rhode Island Department of Environmental Management

=== Canada ===
In 2012, a suspected northern snakehead was found in a pond in Burnaby, British Columbia, but further study revealed that it had been released three months or less before its capture and that it was a blotched snakehead or perhaps a hybrid involving that species. Before its exact identity was revealed, the government of British Columbia introduced legislation banning the possession of snakeheads and several other potentially invasive species. However, unlike the northern snakehead, which could establish a population in parts of Canada, the blotched snakehead generally lives only in warmer waters than those found in Canada.

== World record ==
According to the International Game Fish Association, Damien Cook, caught a world-record 9.53 kg (21 lb 0 oz) northern snakehead in Dorchester County, Maryland, United States, on 5 July 2023

== In traditional culture ==
Northern snakeheads are respected among some Chinese fishermen for their virtue, as parent snakefish are known to sacrifice themselves to protect their young. The young fish are said to rush to feed upon their mother after she gives birth and is temporarily unable to catch prey.

== See also ==
- Northern pike
