= Travilah, Maryland =

- Census-designated place
- Historic Travilah Oak

- Location of Travilah, Maryland
- Coordinates: 39°03′27″N 77°15′38″W
- Country: United States
- State: Maryland
- County: Montgomery

Area
  - Total: 17.64 sq mi (45.70 km^{2})
  - Land: 15.93 sq mi (41.25 km^{2})
  - Water: 1.72 sq mi (4.45 km^{2})
- Elevation: 282 ft (86 m)

Population (2020)
  - Total: 11,985
  - Density: 752.5/sq mi (290.55/km^{2})
- Time zone: UTC−5 (Eastern (EST))
  - Summer (DST): UTC−4 (EDT)
- ZIP Codes: 20854, 20878, 20850
- Area codes: 301, 240
- FIPS code: 24-78650
- GNIS feature ID: 2390400

Travilah is a United States census-designated place and an unincorporated area in Montgomery County, Maryland. It is 17.28 square miles (44.8 km^{2}) located along the north side of the Potomac River, and surrounded by the communities of Potomac, North Potomac, and Darnestown—all census-designated places. It had a population of 11,985 as of the 2020 census.

Within the Travilah census-designated place at the intersection of what are now Travilah Road and Glen Road, the small rural community of Travilah existed in the late 1800s and early 1900s. The community had its own post office, general store, school, town hall, church, and a few homes. The crossroads was popular with area farmers because it was close to the Chesapeake and Ohio Canal (C&O Canal) and at least two mills. The name Travilah comes from Travilah Clagett, who was the community's first postmaster in 1883.

In 2000, the United States Census Bureau began recognizing the area around the original Travilah crossroads community as a census designated place. Much of the area consists of large homes on large tracts of land with numerous parks and nature preserves mixed in. The community is within driving-distance of Washington, D.C., and the I-270 Technology Corridor. Travilah has a median household income of about $235,000.

== Geography ==
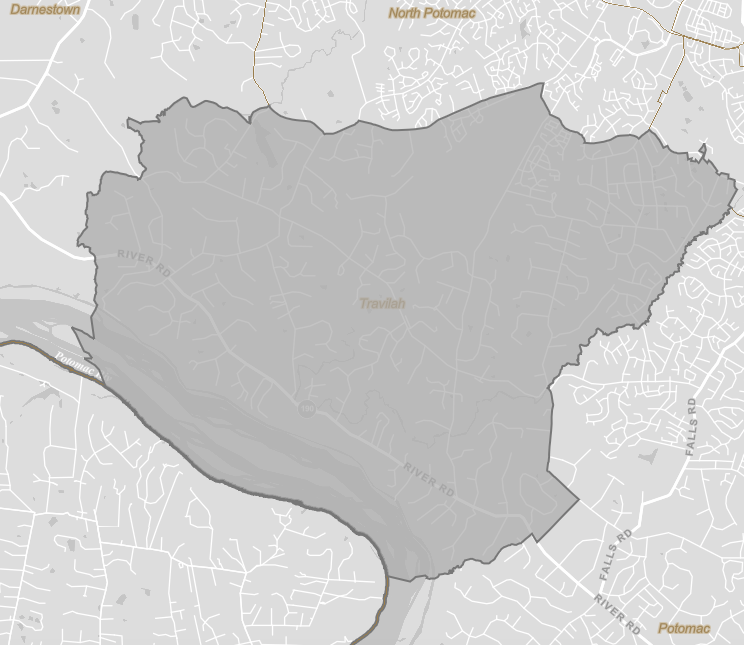
Travilah CDP

As an unincorporated area, Travilah's boundaries are not officially defined. However, the United States Census Bureau began recognizing a Travilah census-designated place (Travilah CDP) in the 2000 Census when the new Travilah CDP was created using portions of the Potomac and North Potomac CDPs. According to the state of Maryland, "The boundaries for CDPs often are defined in partnership with state, local, and/or tribal officials and usually coincide with visible features or the boundary of an adjacent incorporated place or another legal entity." The boundaries of the Travilah CDP are currently those used in the 2010 Census. The Travilah CDP is surrounded by the Darnestown CDP, the North Potomac CDP, the city of Rockville, the Potomac CDP, and the Potomac River—and the old crossroads community of Travilah is located in the west central portion of the CDP.

According to the 2000 Census, the Travilah CDP is part rural and part urban. The urban portion had a 2000 population of 6,894 on 11.71 square miles (30.3 km^{2}), while the rural portion has a 2000 population of 548 on a land area of 2.66 square miles (6.9 km^{2}). An additional 1.19 square miles (3.1 km^{2}) of non-land is located in the rural section. The 2010 Census shows a total population of 12,159 in 3,950 housing units on a land area of 15.83 square miles (41.0 km^{2}) and total area of 17.28 square miles (44.8 km^{2}). Using 2010 Census Data, Travilah has a GIS ID of 303 and a FID of 302. The State FIPS code is 24 and the Place FIPS is 78650. The ANSI Code for Travilah is 02390400 and the Place Identifier is 2478650.

The United States Geological Survey lists six features in Montgomery County with Travilah in all or part of their name. The Travilah Census Designated Place has an ID of 2390400 and an elevation of 233 feet. It has a latitude of 390325N and a longitude of 0771445W—a location of 39°3′25″N 77°14′45″W. The feature named Travilah, different from the Travilah Census Designated Place, is a populated place and has an elevation of 358 with a latitude of 390457N and a longitude of 0771547W. Other features listed are Travilah Acres, Travilah Elementary School, Travilah Meadows, and Travilah Square Shopping Center. (Note: From the USGS web site: Feature Name: Travilah, State: Maryland, County: Montgomery, then click Send Query.)

The three ZIP Codes for the Travilah CDP are 20854 (Potomac), 20878 (Gaithersburg/North Potomac), and 20850 (Rockville). A large portion of the territory uses the Potomac ZIP code, but the northern portion uses the Rockville and Gaithersburg codes. As an example, Greenbrier Park and Pennyfield Lock have Potomac ZIP Codes of 20854 and are in the Travilah CDP.

=== Rivers and streams ===
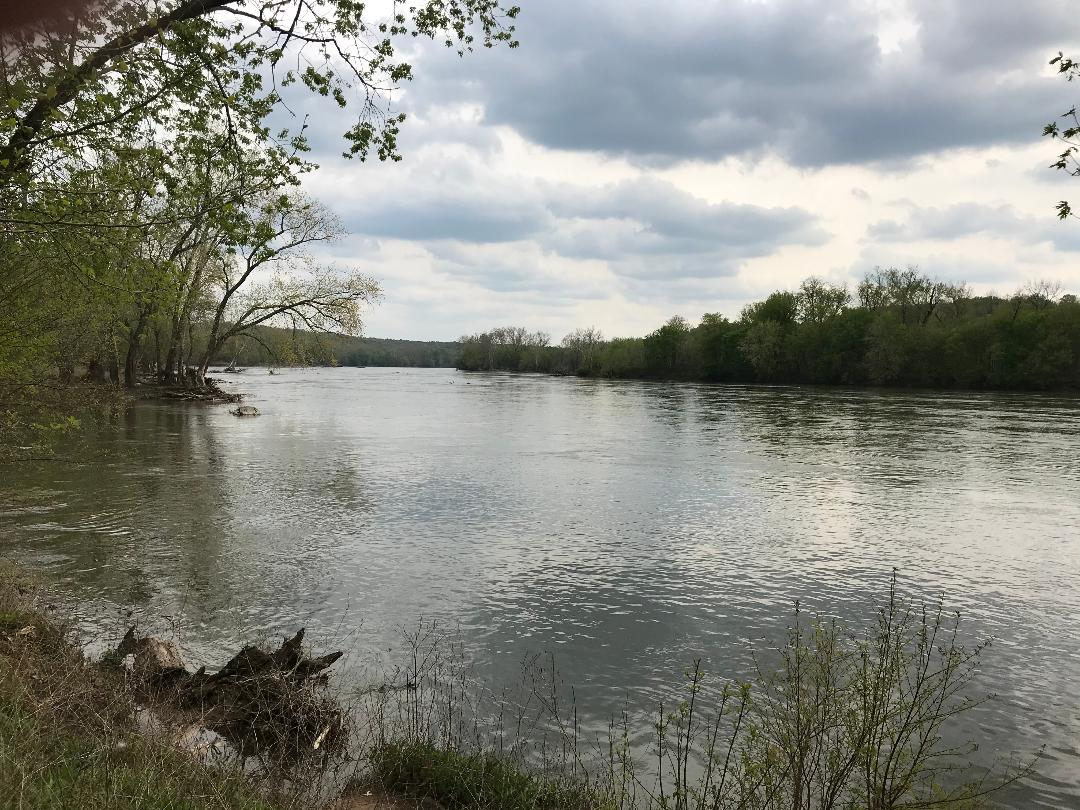
Potomac River at Swains Lock

Because the state of Maryland controls the Potomac River, the Travilah CDP includes portions of the Potomac River in addition to the C&O Canal. Several streams flow through Travilah and into the Potomac River. On the west edge of the CDP, the Muddy Branch flows to the Potomac and forms the western border for the Travilah CDP. The Watts Branch, Sandy Branch, and Greenbrier Branch flow through the middle of the CDP. The Piney Branch flows on the east edge of the CDP forming part of the eastern border.

=== Climate ===
According to the Köppen Climate Classification system, the region close to North Potomac has a humid subtropical climate, abbreviated "Cfa" on climate maps. There are four distinct seasons, with winters being cold with moderate snowfall, while summers can be warm and humid. July is the warmest month, while January is the coldest. Average monthly precipitation ranges from about 2.5 to 4 inches (6.4 to 10.2 centimetres). The highest recorded temperature was 105.0 °F (40.6 °C) and the lowest recorded temperature was −13.0 °F (−25.0 °C). There is a 50 percent probability that the first frost of the season will occur by October 21, and a 50 percent probability that the final frost will occur by April 16.

Climate data for Potomac, MD (same zip code as part of Travilah CDP)
Month	Jan	Feb	Mar	Apr	May	Jun	Jul	Aug	Sep	Oct	Nov	Dec	Year
Mean daily maximum °F (°C)	40 (4)	44 (7)	53 (12)	65 (18)	73 (23)	81 (27)	85 (29)	83 (28)	76 (24)	65 (18)	55 (13)	44 (7)	64 (18)
Mean daily minimum °F (°C)	27 (−3)	29 (−2)	36 (2)	46 (8)	55 (13)	64 (18)	69 (21)	67 (19)	60 (16)	48 (9)	39 (4)	31 (−1)	48 (9)
Average precipitation inches (mm)	2.88 (73)	2.81 (71)	3.61 (92)	3.22 (82)	4.13 (105)	3.49 (89)	3.67 (93)	2.90 (74)	3.83 (97)	3.29 (84)	3.53 (90)	3.00 (76)	40.36 (1,026)
Source: Weather Channel

== Demographics ==
Historical population
Census	Pop.	Note	%±
2000	7,442		—
2010	12,159		63.4%
2020	11,985		−1.4%
Source: U.S. Census (Note: The 2000 U.S. Census lists a Travilah population for 2000, but not for 1980 or 1990.); 2010–2020

=== Racial and ethnic composition ===
Travilah CDP, Maryland – Racial and ethnic composition Note: the US Census treats Hispanic/Latino as an ethnic category. This table excludes Latinos from the racial categories and assigns them to a separate category. Hispanics/Latinos may be of any race.
Race / Ethnicity (NH = Non-Hispanic)	Pop 2000	Pop 2010	Pop 2020	% 2000	% 2010	% 2020
White alone (NH)	5,733	7,167	5,573	77.04%	58.94%	46.50%
Black or African American alone (NH)	257	571	675	3.45%	4.70%	5.63%
Native American or Alaska Native alone (NH)	4	6	6	0.05%	0.05%	0.05%
Asian alone (NH)	1,014	3,609	4,600	13.63%	29.68%	38.38%
Native Hawaiian or Pacific Islander alone (NH)	3	0	1	0.04%	0.00%	0.01%
Other race alone (NH)	6	40	63	0.08%	0.33%	0.53%
Mixed race or Multiracial (NH)	148	327	502	1.99%	2.69%	4.19%
Hispanic or Latino (any race)	277	439	565	3.72%	3.61%	4.71%
Total	7,442	12,159	11,985	100.00%	100.00%	100.00%

=== 2020 census ===
As of the 2020 census, Travilah had a population of 11,985. The median age was 48.3 years. 22.0% of residents were under the age of 18 and 19.9% of residents were 65 years of age or older. For every 100 females there were 99.1 males, and for every 100 females age 18 and over there were 95.6 males age 18 and over.

75.6% of residents lived in urban areas, while 24.4% lived in rural areas.

There were 3,810 households in Travilah, of which 38.5% had children under the age of 18 living in them. Of all households, 78.8% were married-couple households, 7.7% were households with a male householder and no spouse or partner present, and 12.3% were households with a female householder and no spouse or partner present. About 9.2% of all households were made up of individuals and 5.1% had someone living alone who was 65 years of age or older.

There were 3,975 housing units, of which 4.2% were vacant. The homeowner vacancy rate was 0.8% and the rental vacancy rate was 5.4%.

=== 2010 census ===
The 2010 Census shows Travilah with a population of 12,159 in 3,950 housing units, and a land area of 15.83 square miles (41.0 km^{2}) out of a total of 17.28 square miles (44.8 km^{2}). It has an average population density of 768.1 per square mile (296.6/km^{2}), which is much lower than the comparable figure for Maryland's largest city (Baltimore) and Montgomery County's largest city (Rockville)—which are 7,671.9 per square mile (2,962.1/km^{2}) and 4,530.6 per square mile (1,749.3/km^{2}), respectively. Similarly for housing unit density, Travilah is 249.5 per square mile (96.3/km^{2}) while Baltimore and Rockville are 3,665.5 per square mile (1,415.3/km^{2}) and 1,865.2 per square mile (720.2/km^{2}), respectively.

=== Demographic estimates ===
The latest census data for 2018 show a median household income of $235,669 and a poverty rate of 1.6 percent. Owner–occupied housing units account for 93 percent of housing for workers.

Over half of the Asian population is Chinese, while Asian Indian and Korean ethnic groups also have significant populations. English is the only language spoken at home for 55 percent of the population, while 22 percent speak Asian and Pacific Island languages. A total of 45 percent speak a language other than English at home, while the average for the United States is 22 percent. The educational attainment for the community compares favorably to the average for the United States, with 97.3 percent of Travilah residents eligible being a high school graduate or higher, while the same figure for the United States is 87.7 percent. A graduate or professional degree was attained by 53.0 percent.

== Government ==
Citizens of Travilah are part of either District 1 or District 3 in the Montgomery County Council. The county council has representatives from each of five districts plus four at-large members. All members are elected at once and serve four-year terms.

== Economy ==
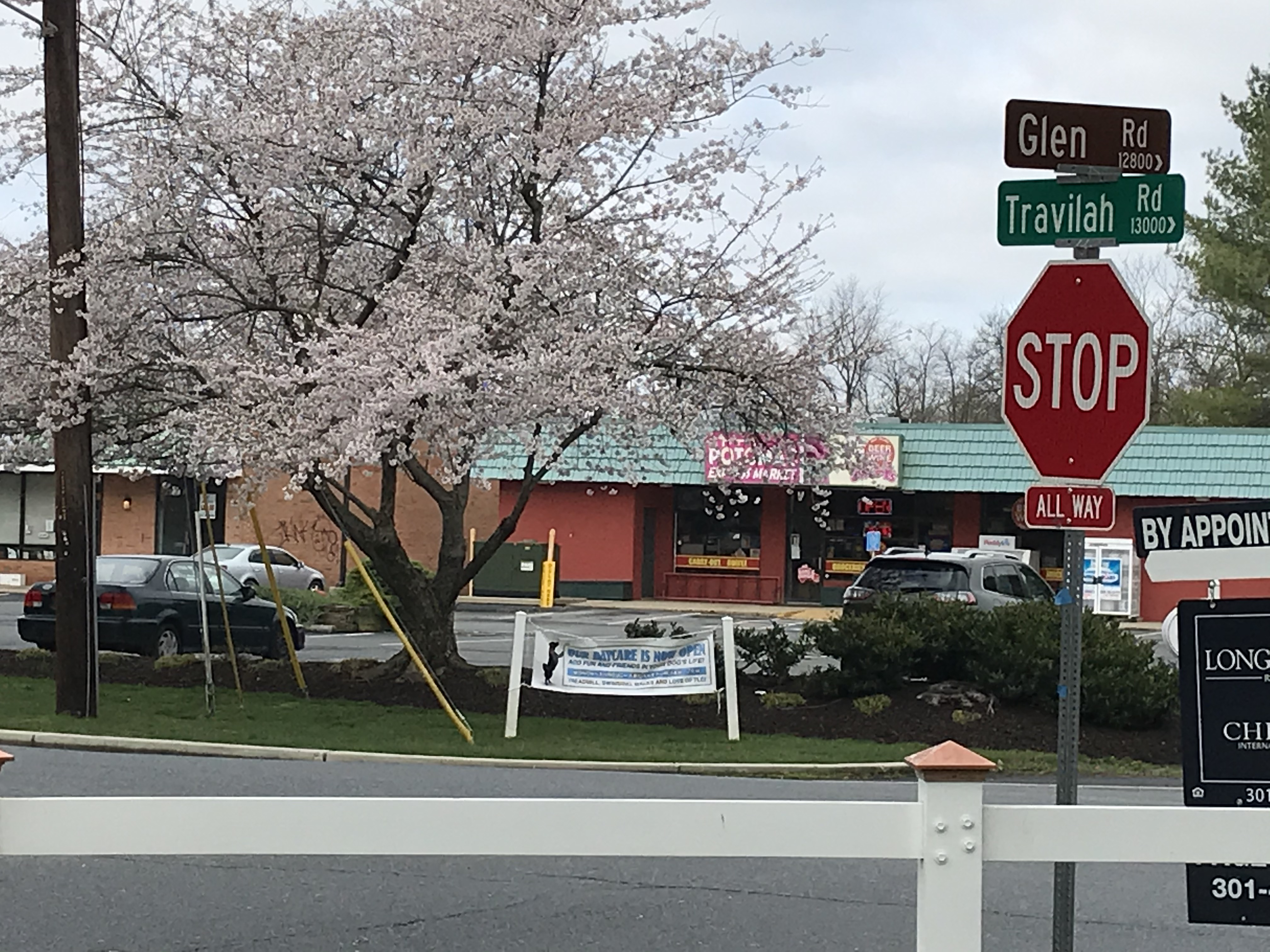
Potomac Oak Center in 2020

In 2011, Potomac (and a portion of Travilah) was described as a place "dotted with massive houses that sit on vast plots of land" or with "jaw dropping houses". In 2019, Bloomberg News listed Potomac and Travilah among the top 50 wealthiest places in America. Travilah was ranked 24th, and had been ranked 25th in the previous year. A 2018 article in USA Today said Travilah "is the wealthiest town in the wealthiest state" and "only town in Maryland where over half of all homes are worth over $1 million".

The median household income in Travilah is $235,669. The median earnings for male full–time, year–round workers is $144,298 based on 2018 data. Median earnings for female full–time, year–round workers is $108,984—more than double the United States average of $41,690. The most common means of transportation to work is driving alone, and 68 percent of the workers do that, while 13 percent carpool. The average commuting time is 34 minutes, higher than the U.S. average of 27 minutes. About 12 percent of Travilah residents work at home. The distance from Travilah to Washington DC is less than 20 miles (32 km), and from Travilah to Shady Grove Hospital and Interstate 270 (and its technology corridor) is under 10 miles (16 km). (Note: Distances are from the Pennyfield Lock in the southwestern corner of the Travilah CDP, so most Travilah mileages will be shorter. The distance from the lock to Washington DC is 18.4 miles (29.6 km). The distance from the lock to Interstate 270 is 7.6 miles (12.2 km). The distance from the lock to Shady Grove Hospital is 6.5 miles (10.5 km). The I-270 Technology Corridor is "one of the top tech/biotech clusters in the United States".)

Much of Travilah's wealth has been attributed to "high-paying government and contracting jobs in and around the nation's capital". Of the civilian employed workforce aged 16 or higher, 52 percent are employees of private companies, 21 percent are government workers, and 13 percent are employed in their own business. The Professional, Scientific, Management, Administrative, and Waste Management Services category accounts for about 25 percent of employees, while the Educational Services, and Healthcare and Social Assistance category accounts for about 21 percent of employees. Public Administration accounts for an additional 12 percent; and Finance and Insurance, and Real Estate and Rental and Leasing accounts for 11 percent.

Travilah residents are attracted to the area because of its serenity, schools, and proximity to Washington. There are few shopping centers in the area. The Potomac Oak Center is a small shopping center within the Travilah CDP that is a favorite of area cyclists. The Potomac Village Shopping Center is just outside of Travilah on River Road on the west side of the Potomac CDP. North Potomac and Rockville also have shopping and other businesses. Based on 2012 Census data, total healthcare and social assistance receipts for the Travilah CDP totaled to $15.6 million, and accommodation and food service sales totaled to $11.6 million. Total merchant wholesaler sales were $10.4 million, and total retail sales were $8.9 million.

== Transportation ==
=== Roads and highways ===
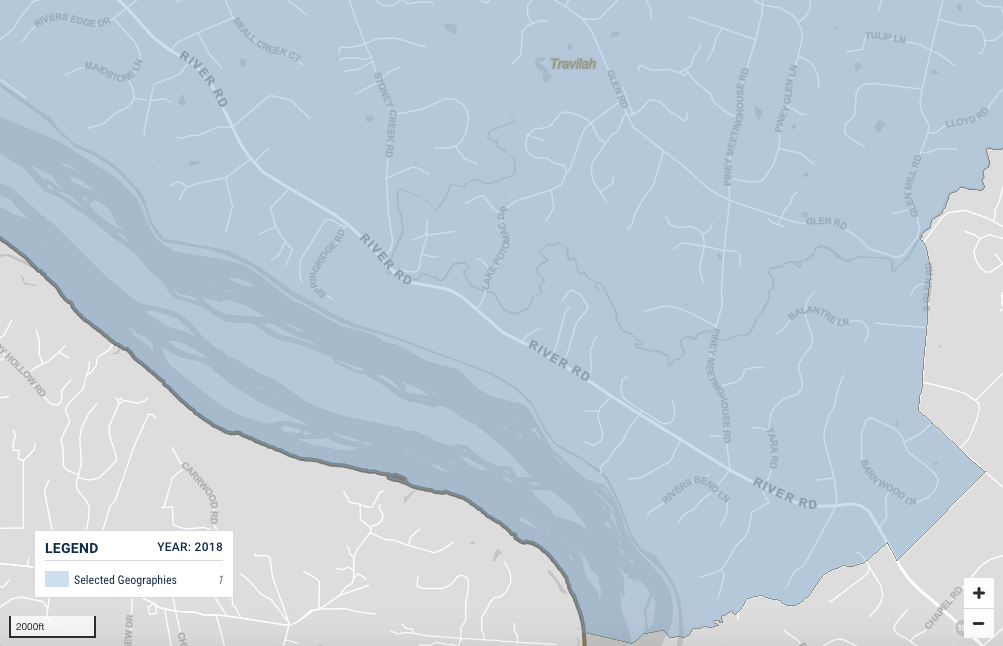
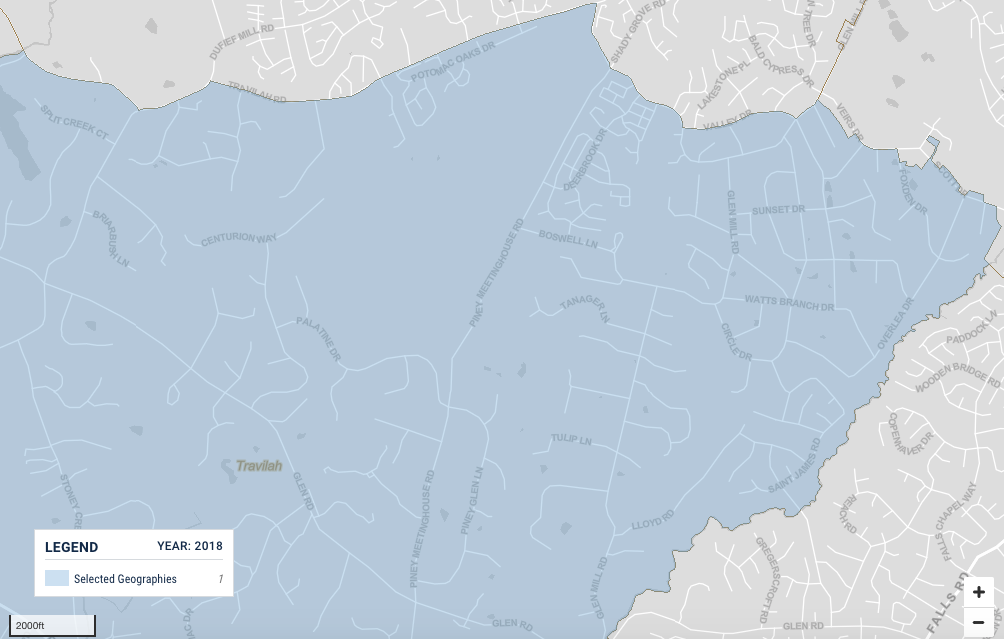
Southern and northeastern Travilah CDP

Maryland Route 190, a state highway known as River Road, is an important highway for the southern portion of Travilah that runs along the Potomac River and connects with Interstate 495 (Capital Beltway)—the highway that circles Washington, DC. River Road can also be used to connect to the Clara Barton Parkway for another route to Washington. Both highways are part of the Chesapeake and Ohio Canal Scenic Byway. Washington is less than 20 miles away, and the drive to Washington for some residents using the Clara Barton Parkway takes only 30 minutes.

In northern Travilah, residents can use Piney Meetinghouse Road to connect to Shady Grove Road and then Interstate 270 or Interstate 370 and the Intercounty Connector toll road (MD 200). On the western side of Travilah, Travilah Road connects River Road in the south to Darnestown Road and Shady Grove Road in the north. Maryland's Interstate 270 is a major north–south highway in the area. Interstate 370 and the Intercounty Connector are major east–west highways that connect to Interstate 95.

=== Public transportation ===
Portions of the Washington Metropolitan Area Transit Authority's (a.k.a. "Metro" or "Metrorail") subway system are located in Montgomery County, and Red Line stations on the west side of the county are closest to Travilah. Among those west side Metro stations are Shady Grove (Gaithersburg), Rockville, Twinbrook (south Rockville), North Bethesda, and Grosvenor-Strathmore (North Bethesda). Montgomery County's Ride-On bus route 301 runs from Tobytown Drive (Travilah CDP near River Road) to the Rockville Metro station, and has stops along its route at the intersection of Travilah and Glen Roads (Potomac Oak Shopping Center) through the west side of Travilah. This route also has a stop at the Shady Grove Hospital. Ride-On bus route 67 runs from the Universities at Shady Grove (Traville Transit Center) to the Shady Grove Metro station, and has a stop on Piney Meetinghouse Road along a route that proceeds through North Potomac on Travilah Road and Dufief Mill Road.

== Education ==
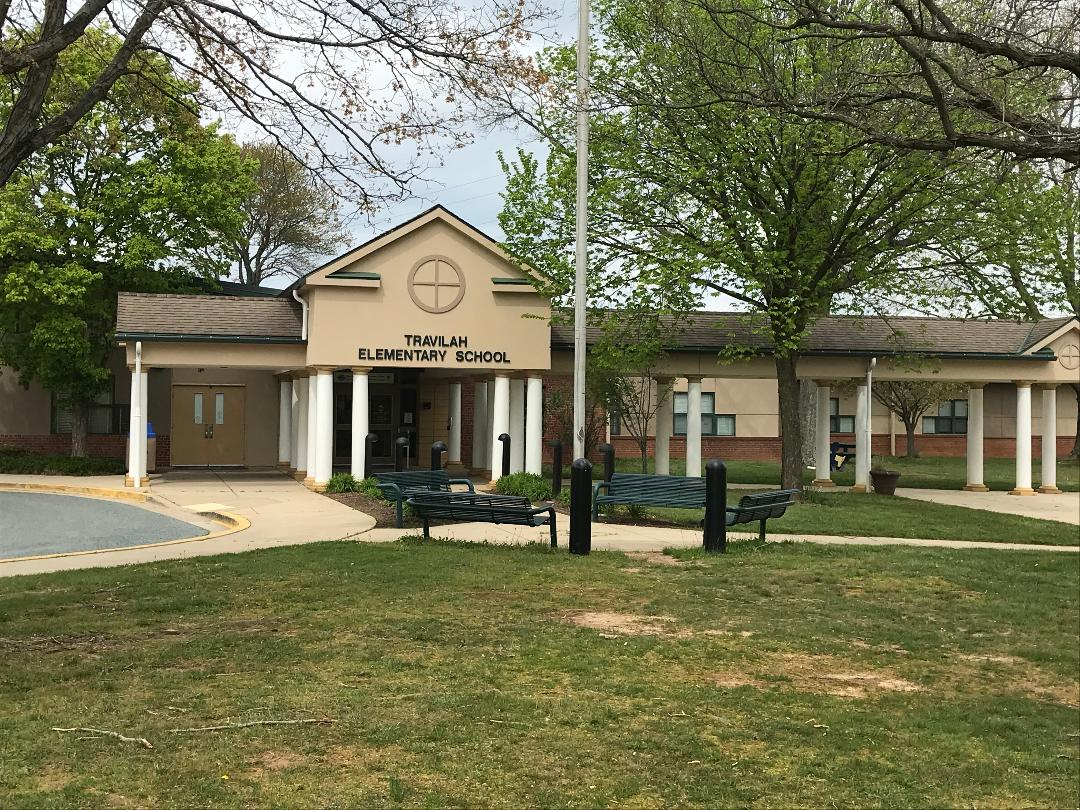
Travilah Elementary

Travilah is served by Montgomery County Public Schools. Depending on the location in the Travilah CDP, public high school students attend Winston Churchill, Thomas S. Wootton, or Northwest. (Note: For example: the historic Harrison and Ada Ward Farm address of 13501 Travilah Rd 20878 is in the Wootton High School district with Robert Frost Middle School and Travilah Elementary School, and the old house at the intersection of Travilah and Glen roads with an address of 12601 Glenn Rd 20854 is in the Churchill High School district with Herbert Hoover Middle School and Potomac Elementary School.) Churchill High School has been ranked as the top school in Maryland and one of the top 500 in the nation. For Travilah Residents that attend Churchill (which has a Potomac address) Herbert Hoover Middle School feeds into that school, and Potomac or Wayside Elementary feed into Hoover. Wootton High School has a Rockville address. Area residents have cited the Wootton school cluster as a factor in their home buying decision. In 2019, U.S. News & World Report ranked Wootton High School 2nd highest in Maryland and 125th in the nation. For most Travilah residents that will attend Wootton, Robert Frost Middle School feeds into Wootton, and Travilah Elementary School feeds into Frost. A small area in the Travilah CDP that is in the Wootton district attends Stone Mill Elementary and Cabin John Middle School. Travilah residents that live in the extreme southwest portion of the CDP start at Darnestown Elementary School, then go to Lakelands Park Middle School and Northwest High School. Northwest High School is a "county powerhouse" in football, winning state championships in 2013 and 2014. Bullis is a private school located in Potomac on Falls Road that serves elementary, middle, and high school students. Other private school options are available in Rockville, Bethesda, and North Bethesda.

=== Higher education ===
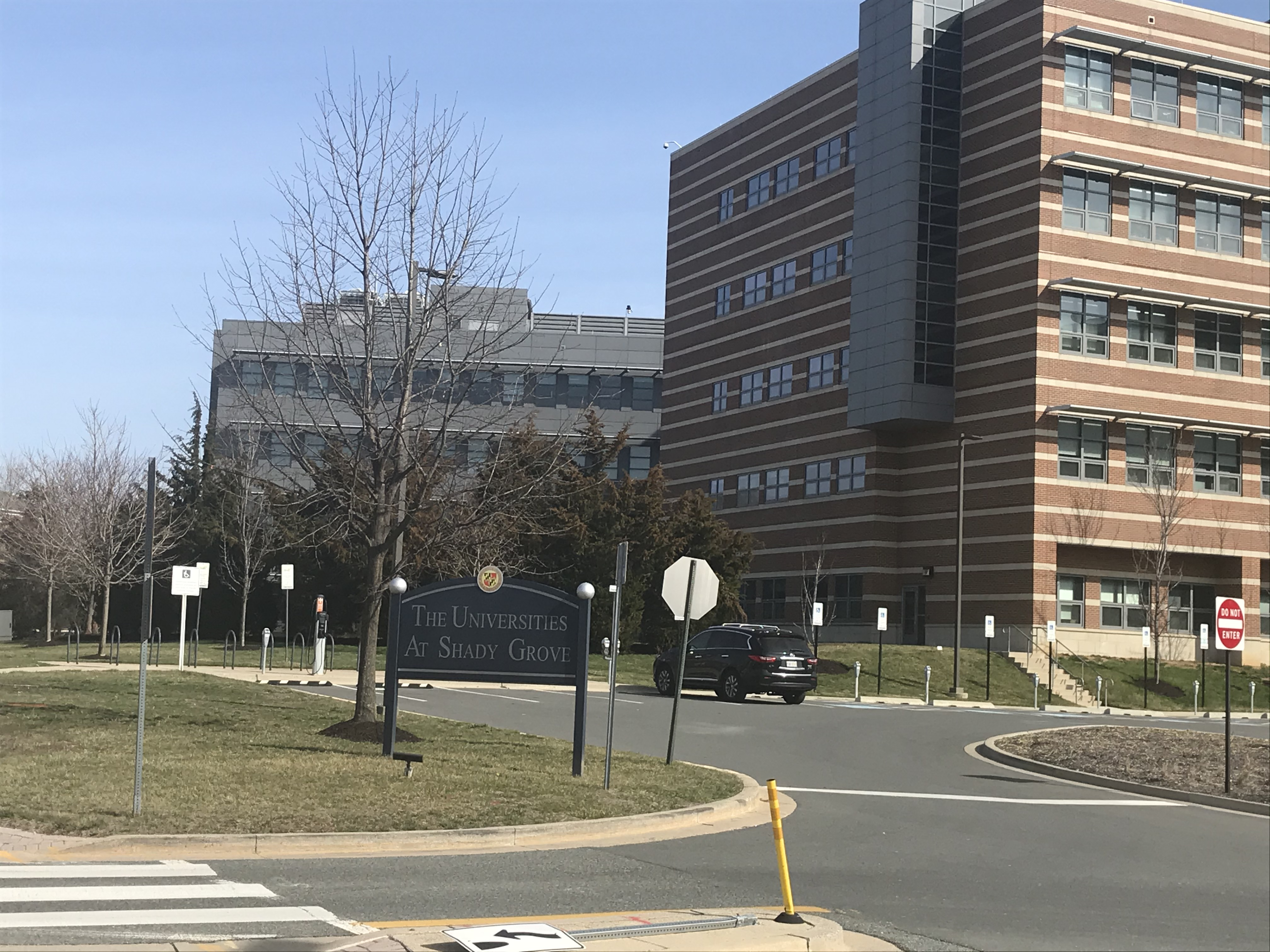
The Universities at Shady Grove

Travilah residents have higher education opportunities in nearby Rockville plus larger universities such as Georgetown University, American University, George Washington University, Catholic University, University of Maryland, and others located farther away. The Universities at Shady Grove is located close to the Travilah CDP and uses a Rockville address. It offers select degree programs from nine public Maryland universities. This unique partnership with University System of Maryland universities enables 80 upper-level undergraduate, graduate degree and certificate programs to be made available to about 3,000 students. Johns Hopkins University has a campus in Rockville located close to the Universities at Shady Grove. Montgomery College has a campus in Rockville and a training center in Gaithersburg. Three Montgomery College campuses and online classes serve about 54,000 students who can earn an associate degree or advance their education.

=== Public library ===
Potomac Library, constructed in 1985 by the county as part of the Montgomery County Public Library system, is located in Potomac near the southeast portion of the Travilah CDP. Two more nearby libraries are also in the county library system. The Quince Orchard Library is located on Quince Orchard Road in North Potomac, and Rockville Memorial Library is located two blocks from the Rockville Metro station. The Quince Orchard Library began operations around 2000, while the Rockville library began in 1951. Priddy Library is part of the University of Maryland Libraries system and is located at the Universities at Shady Grove in North Potomac. The Priddy Library opened in 2007 and is available to the public.

== History ==
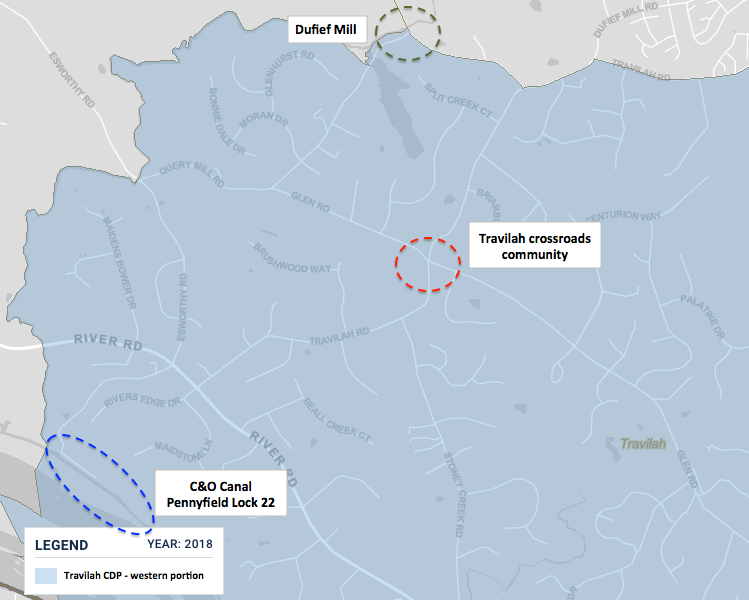
DuFief Mill, Travilah crossroads, C&O Canal

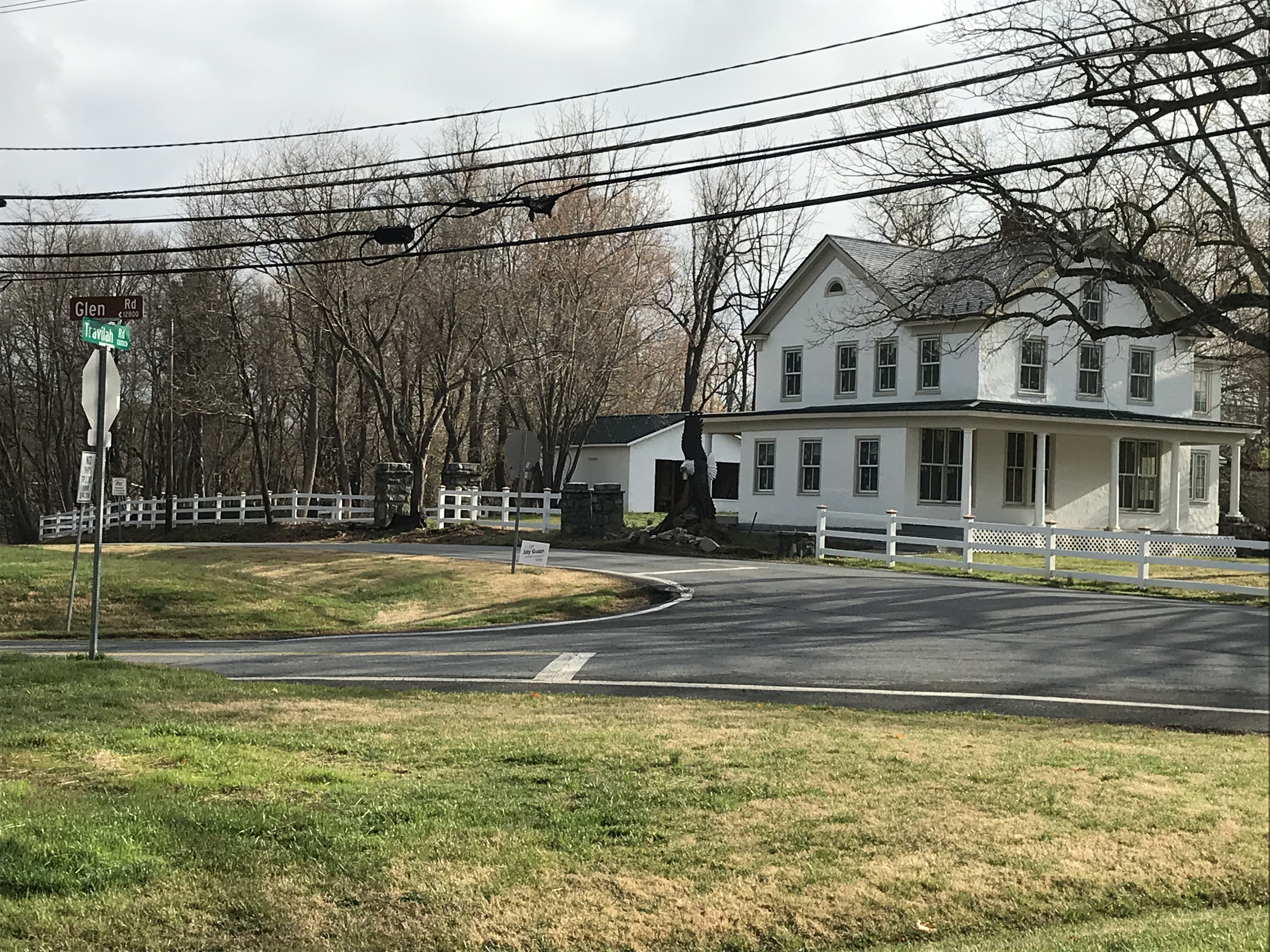
150-year-old house at Travilah

The Travilah community has a long history that dates back to the 1800s at a crossroads at what is now Travilah Road and Glen Road. A small unnamed agricultural community grew at this intersection in the mid-1800s because it was less than 2 miles (3.2 km) from the Chesapeake and Ohio Canal (a.k.a. C&O Canal). (Note: Construction of the C&O Canal, which began in the 1830s and was completed in 1850, "created markets for goods and services" and "lowered the cost of shipping commodities such as flour, wheat, and corn". A newspaper article discussing Travilah says that "The canal was the main thing that held this together". Using today's roads, the driving distance from the intersection of Glen and Travilah roads to C&O Canal Lockhouse 22 (Pennyfield Lock) is 1.9 miles (3.1 km) and the distance to Lockhouse 21 (Swains) is 3.5 miles (5.6 km).) The intersecting roads also led to mills that were located within a few miles of the intersection, and many of the area farms produced the wheat used by the mills to make flour. (Note: In the 1790s, wheat farms became more common in Montgomery County compared to the tobacco farms of earlier years. The intersecting roads at what became Travilah were parts of routes to "two productive mills". The DuFief Mill, established around 1850, was about 1.7 miles (2.7 km) from the Travilah crossroads (using today's roads). It had the capacity to make 10-12,000 barrels of flour per year. The Glen Mill, built in the early 1800s, was about 3.5 miles (5.6 km) away from the crossroads.)

The community had a general store in 1882 that may have existed as early as the 1840s. (Note: Sources do not agree on the beginning date for the general store. One source mentions "the Old Travilah Country Store built in the 1840s", while another source says "Later (in 1882), a store was opened....") In 1883, the unnamed community was assigned a Post Office. Travilah Clagett was the first postmaster, and the United States Post Office used the name Travilah to identify the unnamed location. (Note: A newspaper article mentions Travilah Clagett's relationship with the Post Office as does Kelly in Places from the Past, including the start date. An example of the Travilah Post Office listing can be found in the 1886 United States Official Postal Guide.) The Clagetts were prominent land owners in this portion of Montgomery County. (Note: Henry Clagett patented a tract called Quince Orchard in 1766. The land was located at the intersection of what is now Quince Orchard Road and Darnestown Road (Maryland 28) in Montgomery County. A portion of that land eventually became Gaithersburg's Kentlands neighberhood. Henry's grandson John H. Clagett, who served as a captain in a Maryland regiment during the War of 1812, bought a farm in what is now Germantown, Maryland, in 1810. He was one of "many of that family living nearby". John Clagett's son, Nathaniel, was a prominent and affluent member of the community and was the father of Travilah Clagett.) Clagett served as postmaster for about half the year, and died from tuberculosis before the year was over.

In addition to the general store, the crossroads had a blacksmith, church, schoolhouse, and town hall. The Travilah Baptist Church was built in 1894 and had over 300 members in 1976. The original church building (circa 1894) was removed by a controlled burn by the Rockville Volunteer Fire Department in 1980, due to its asbestos content. A Travilah Elementary School exists today at the intersection of Dufief Mill Road and Travilah Road in North Potomac, but it should not be confused with the one-room schoolhouse formerly located at the Travilah crossroads that closed in 1943 (and later burned down). The original schoolhouse was built in 1865. (Note: Sources conflict on the build date for the old Travilah schoolhouse—one says 1865 while another says 1886. However, an 1865 map of Montgomery County by Martenet and Bond shows a schoolhouse (Sch.H.) at the location that became Travilah.) A town hall was built in 1910, and the building still exists today although it is privately owned. The general store, which eventually was also a gas station, closed in 1967.

A small corner shopping center, built in 1979, is located at the Travilah Road-Glen Road intersection. The center was originally named Glenvilah Shopping Center, but was renamed Potomac Oak Center in honor of the historic Travilah Oak tree located there close to Travilah Road. Several homes were also located in the area and a large 150-year-old farmhouse remains across from the shopping center.

== Historic sites ==
Montgomery County's history began over 300 years ago. There are historic sites in the Travilah area, some of which are privately owned. For example, the original Travilah Town Hall, built in 1910, still stands, but is privately owned. The historic Travilah Baptist Church, built in 1894, was burned and the remains buried by RVFD in 1980. The modern church building, built in 1968, and the attached educational wing, built in 1976, remain today. The church bell from the 1894 church is still intact and is mounted at ground level in front of the current church. The church was the gathering place for the families that farmed the local fields and raised livestock, including producing dairy that would be taken by wagon into Washington, DC, every day.

=== Harrison and Ada Ward Farm ===
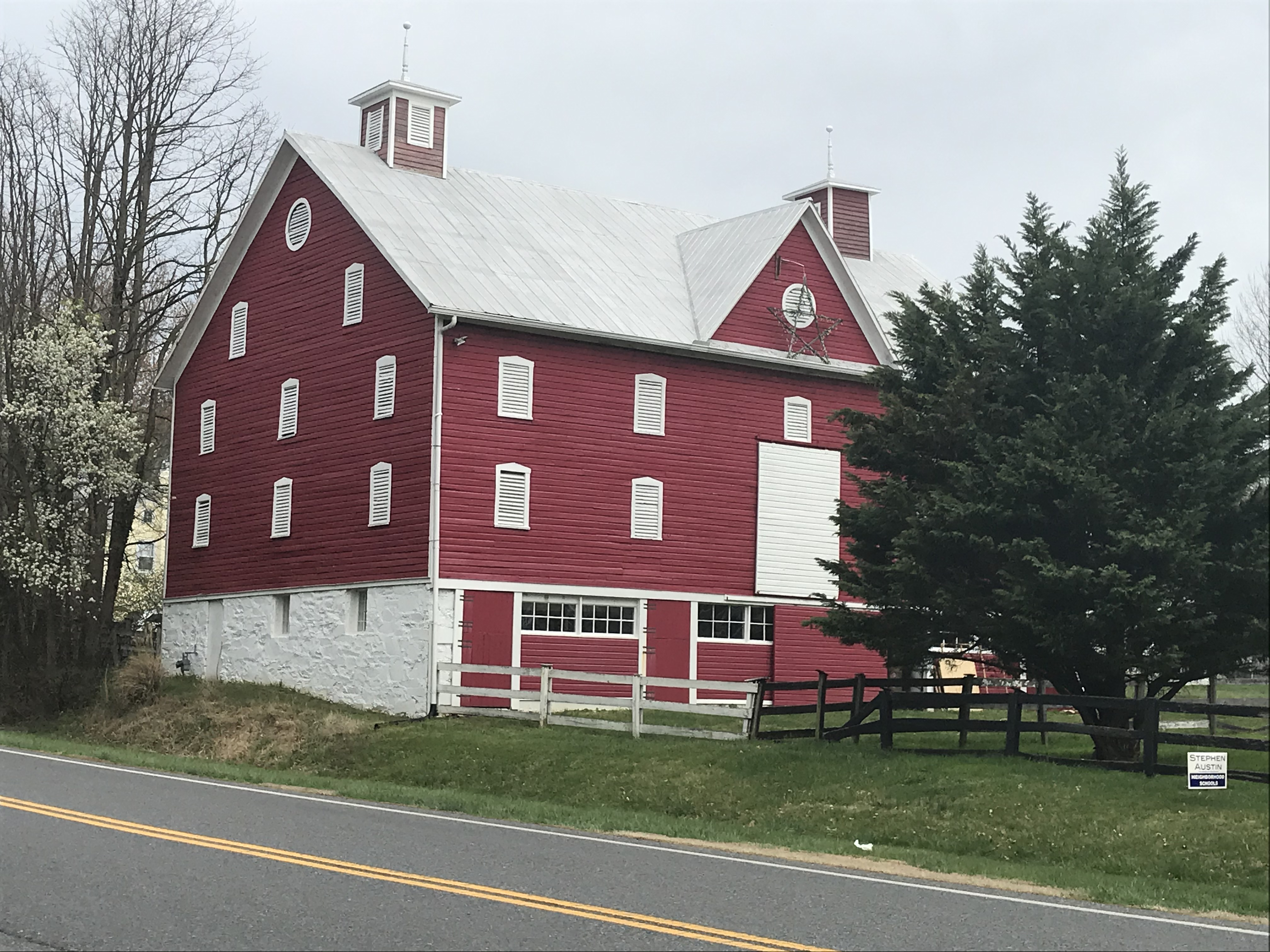
Ward Farm Barn

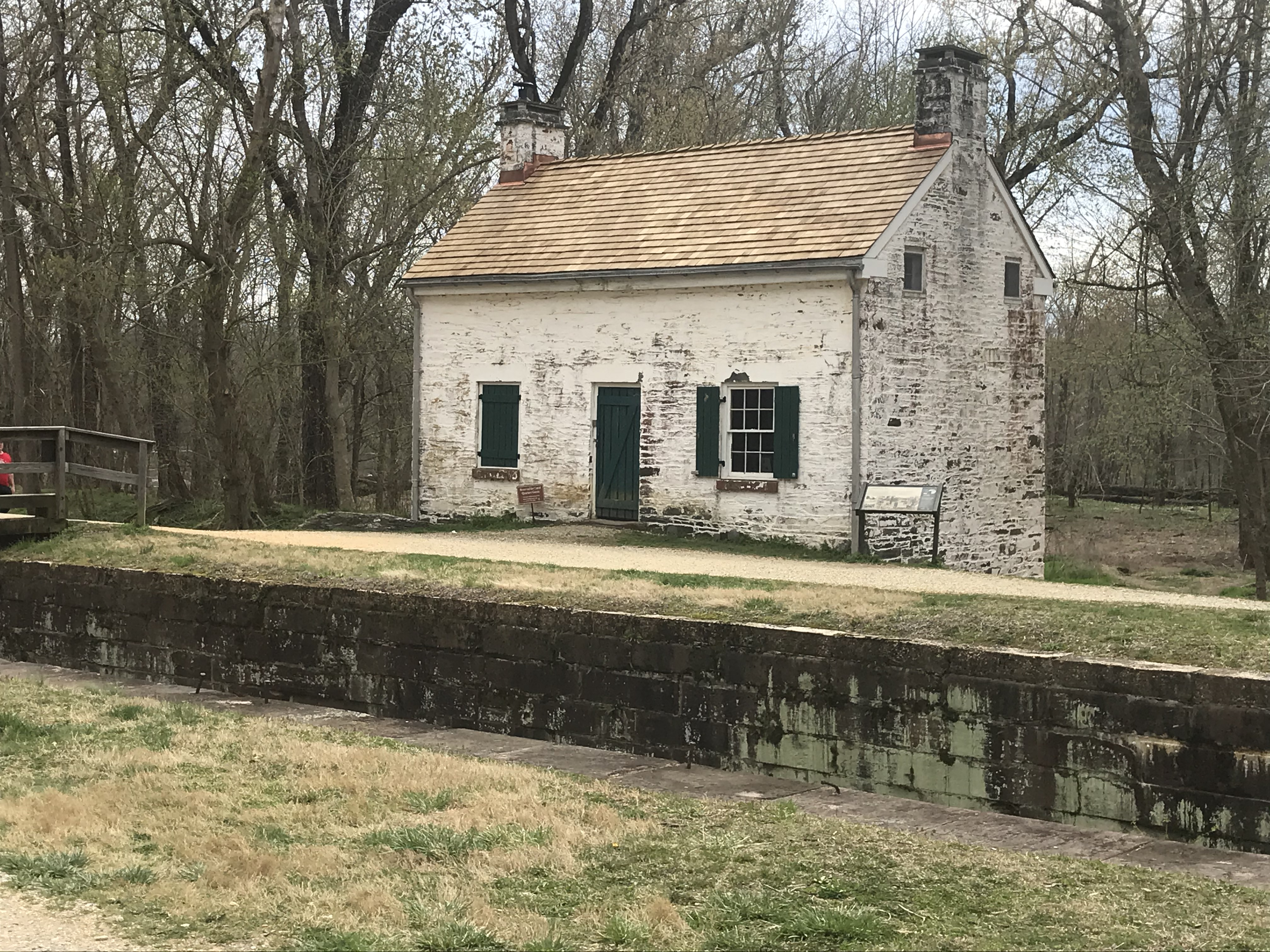
Pennyfield Lock House

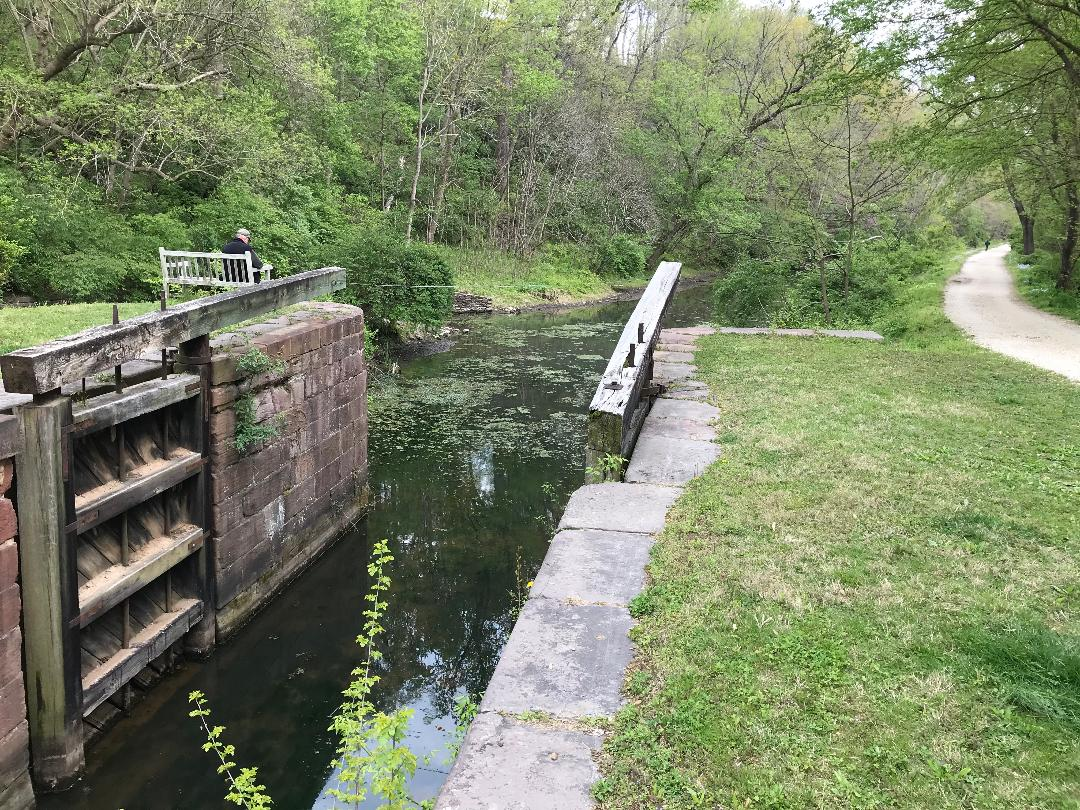
Swain's Lock

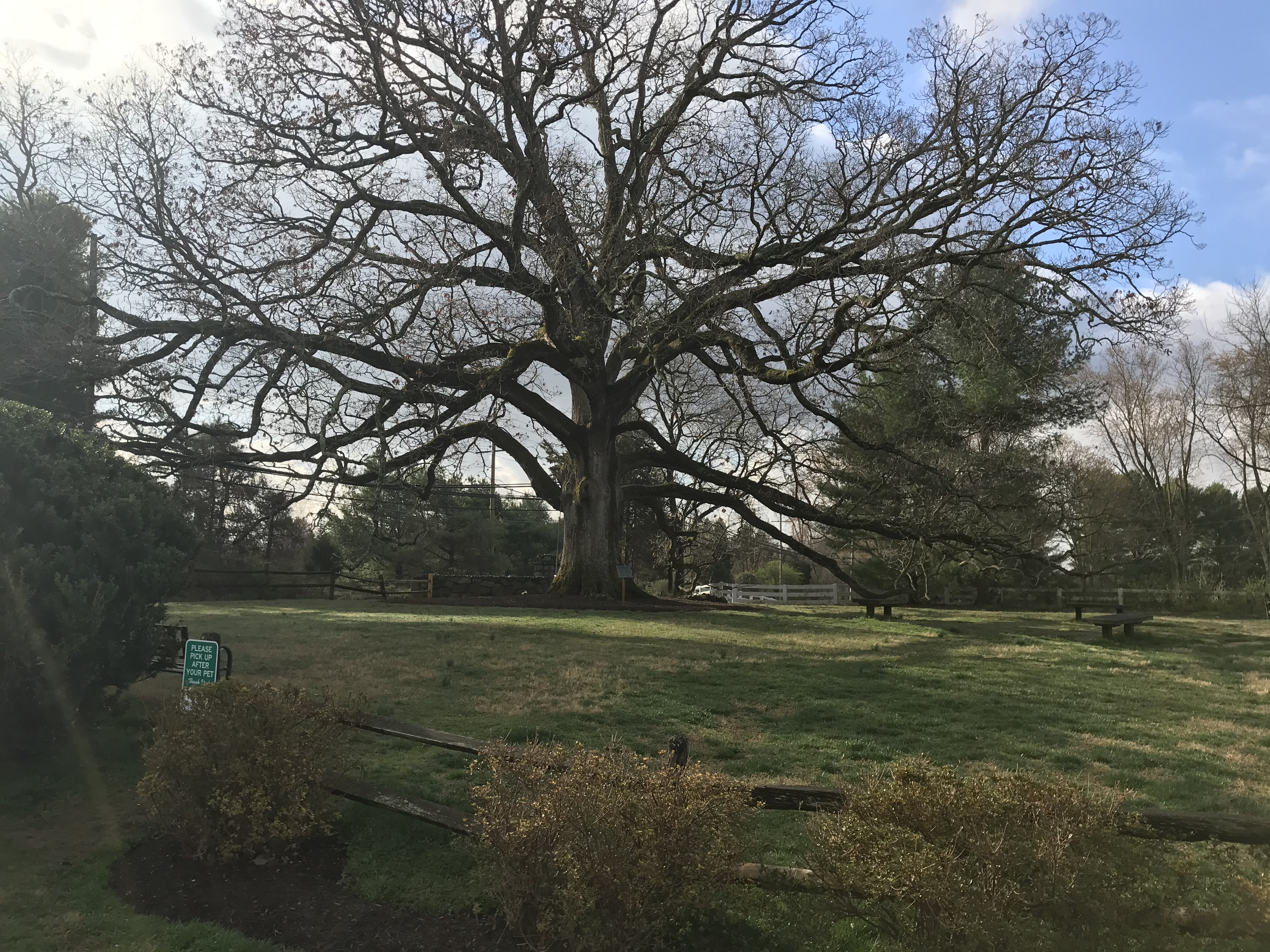
Travilah Oak in 2020

The Harrison and Ada Ward Farm was built around 1885, and prospered in part because it was located not far from the Pennyfield Lock on the Chesapeake and Ohio Canal on what is now Travilah Road. The farm originally grew wheat, corn, and hay, and later raised dairy cows. The farm's bright red bank barn, which has exceptional architectural detail, is located right next to the road.

=== Pennyfield Lock House ===
The Pennyfield Lock House (Lock #22) is located in the western portion of the Travilah CDP in the Chesapeake and Ohio Canal National Historical Park. The lock house was built around 1830, and its lock was completed around 1831. (Note: The Chesapeake and Ohio Canal was necessary because the Potomac River was not navigable by ships/barges at Great Falls—"a spectacular series of falls and rapids".) John L. DuFief built a mill around 1850 on the Muddy Branch, and it had a road that connected to the Pennyfield Lock. His mill had the capacity to manufacture 10–12,000 barrels of flour per year, and a network of roads grew that enabled farmers to get their crops to the mill and canal. The DuFief Mill was about 1.7 miles (2.7 km) from the Travilah crossroads, and an alternative mill (Glen Mill) was 3.3 miles away. (Note: The Glen Mill was built in the early 1800s. Using today's roads, the driving distance from the intersection of Glen and Travilah roads to the miller's house for the DuFief Mill is 1.7 miles (2.7 km) and the distance to Glen Mill is 3.5 miles (5.6 km).) The small community of Travilah thrived because of its crossroads location and proximity to the canal. The canal was completed as far north as Cumberland, Maryland, by 1850 (and never did reach the Ohio River), and one fourth of its 185 miles (298 km) are in Montgomery County. By 1859, about 83 barges per week were using the canal to transport coal, grain, flour, and farm products to Washington and Georgetown.

=== Swain's Lock House ===
Swains Lock House (Lock #21) is located in the eastern portion of the Travilah CDP in the Chesapeake and Ohio Canal National Historical Park. The lock and lock house were built in 1831. The house is one of the largest canal lock houses, and made from oversized sandstone bricks. Jesse Swain was lock keeper beginning in 1907, and had been a canal boatman. His father (John) had helped with the canal construction, and his grandson (Fred) has lived in the house and operated an onsite concession stand into the 21st century. At least two Swain children, and a cousin, were born in the house. The family lived in the house until 2006, when the National Park Service took over maintenance. Today, picnic tables are located between the Potomac River and the lock and lock house.

=== Tobytown cemetery ===
The Tobytown Cemetery, which is located off River Road near the Pennyfield Lock, is the only remaining relic associated with the Black community of Tobytown that was established in 1875 by formerly enslaved people. The community was established by William Davis, Ailsie Martin, and Emory Genus, and is believed to be named for Ailsie Martin's son—Tobias Martin. The cemetery contains about 25 gravestones for early settlers and family members. Most of the stones are unmarked, which is typical for early African American cemeteries.

=== Travilah Oak ===
The Travilah Oak, a white oak tree estimated to be 275 to 300 years old, is located at the intersection of Travilah and Glen roads in Maryland. In 2006, the tree was listed as having a height of 98 feet (30 m), a crown spread of approximately 100 feet (30 m), and a circumference of 17.5 feet (5.3 m). A small park, open to the public, surrounds the huge tree. The crossroads was once the community of Travilah, and consisted of a general store, a town hall, a few homes, and a church.

=== Travilah Town Hall ===
The Travilah Town Hall was built around 1910, and the building was used for meetings and entertainment. The corporation formed to construct the building defaulted on its mortgage in 1918, and it became privately owned although it continued to be used for community purposes. Although the building has historical significance, it is currently privately–owned.

== Culture, recreation, and wildlife ==
Travilah has been called one of the best places to live in Maryland by multiple sources. In addition to its highly rated schools, proximity to desirable workplaces, tranquility, and history, it has numerous parks and other amenities. The Glenstone private art museum is located not far from the historic Travilah crossroads at the intersection of Travilah Road and Glen Road.

=== Parks ===
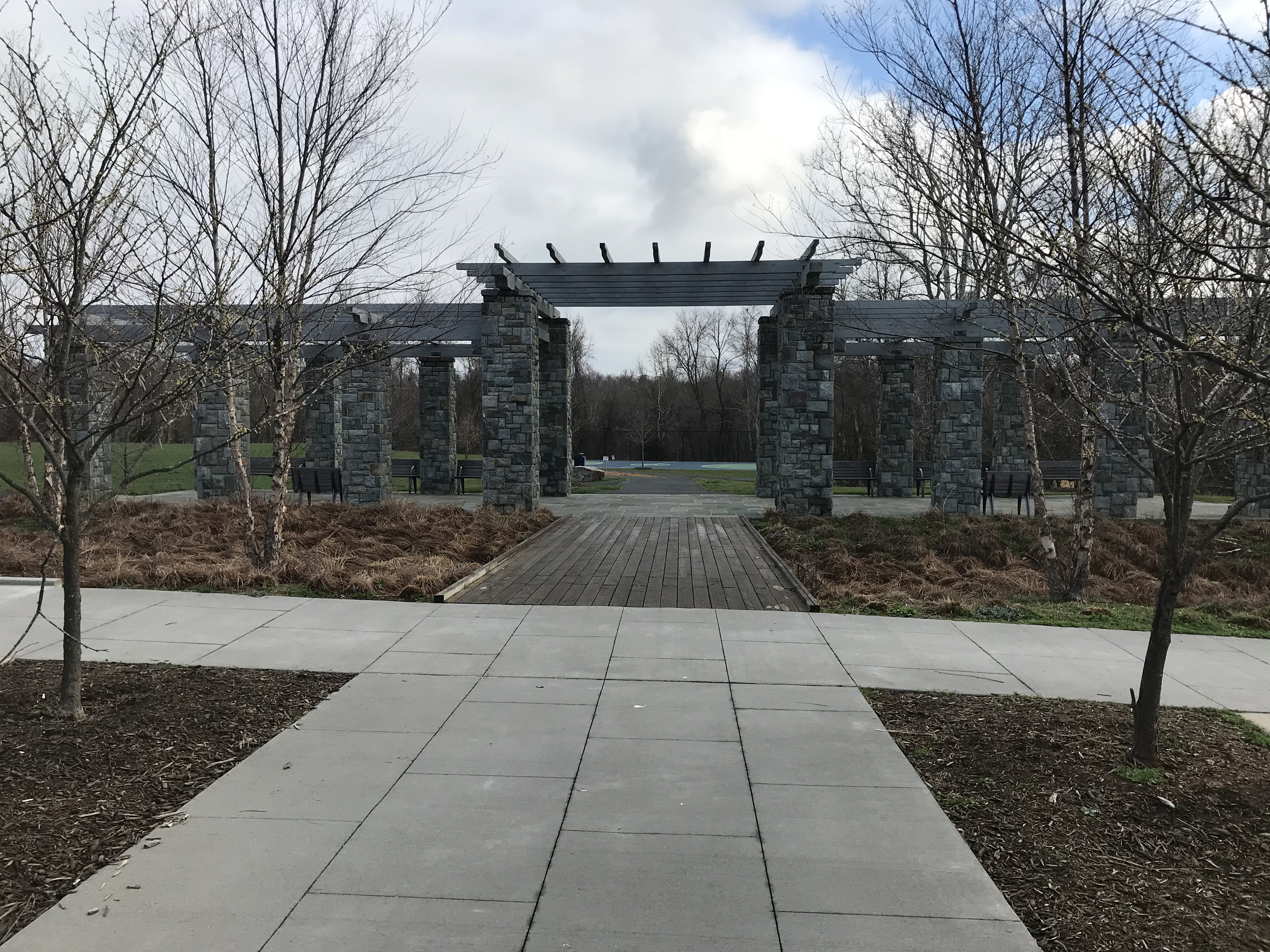
Greenbriar Park

- Adventure Conservation Park – undeveloped 14 acres (5.7 ha)
- Chesapeake & Ohio Canal National Park – historic canal 184.5 miles (296.9 km) with falls, trails, campgrounds
- Glen Hills Local Park – 25.2 acres (10.2 ha) sports and picnic area
- Greenbrier Local Park – 25 acres (10 ha) playground, sports and picnic area
- Muddy Branch Stream Valley Park – 876 acres (355 ha) and 9 miles (14 km) of trails
- Pennyfield Lock Neighborhood Conservation Area – 1.9 acres (0.77 ha) with boat ramp
- Serpentine Barrens Conservation Park – 350 acres (140 ha) horseback limited to park edge
- Tobytown Neighborhood Park – playground, tennis, basketball
- Watts Branch Stream Valley Park – 438 acres (177 ha) undeveloped

=== Wildlife ===
The Travilah area has a population of white-tailed deer that is managed by Montgomery County. Other animals common in the area include red foxes and eastern gray squirrels. The county has Canada geese, hawks, owls, woodpeckers, blue jays, crows, and other birds that stay year-round. Birds such as the Carolina wren, house finch, American goldfinch, eastern bluebird, and northern cardinal can be found at bird feeders.

== Notes ==
=== References ===
- Dwyer, Michael (2006). Montgomery County. Charleston, SC: Arcadia Publishing. ISBN 978-0-73854-274-4. OCLC 70850434.
- Kelly, Clare Lise; Maryland-National Capital Park and Planning Commission (2011). Places from the Past: The Tradition of Gardez Bien in Montgomery County, Maryland - 10th Anniversary Edition (PDF). Silver Spring, Maryland: Maryland-National Capital Park and Planning Commission. ISBN 978-0-97156-070-3. OCLC 48177160.
- MacMaster, Richard K.; Hiebert, Ray Eldon (1994). A Grateful Remembrance : The Story of Montgomery County, Maryland. Rockville, Maryland: Montgomery County Historical Society. ISBN 978-0-96438-198-8. OCLC 871719075.
- U.S. Census Bureau (2003). 2000 Census of Population and Housing, Population and Housing Unit Counts, Maryland. Washington, DC: U.S. Government Printing Office. ISBN 978-0-16067-313-9. OCLC 53980126.
- U.S. Census Bureau (2012). United States Summary, 2010 - Population and Housing Unit Counts. Washington, DC: U.S. Government Printing Office. OCLC 829388018.
- U.S. Department of Transportation; Maryland Department of Transportation (2002). Multi-Modal Corridor Study, Frederick and Montgomery Counties, Maryland - Draft Environmental Impact Statement and Section 4(f) Evaluation Volume 2 of 2. Baltimore, MD: Maryland Department of Transportation. OCLC 49960675.
- United States Post Office Department (1886). United States Official Postal Guide - Second Series Vol. VIII No. 1. Washington, DC: U.S. Government Printing Office. OCLC 2483030.
- Welles, Judith (2019). Potomac. Charleston, South Carolina: Arcadia Publishing. ISBN 978-1-46710-436-4. OCLC 1111392250.
- Zdravkovska, Nevenka (2011). Academic Branch Libraries in Changing Times. Oxford, U.K.: Chandos Pub. ISBN 978-1-78063-270-4. OCLC 1047817835.
