= Travilah Oak =

Large white oak located in Travilah, Maryland, United States

Coordinates: 39°04′03″N 77°15′48″W

The Travilah Oak blooming in April 2011

The Travilah Oak is a large White Oak located in the Potomac Oak Shopping Center. The shopping center is located at the corner of Travilah Road and Glen Road in Travilah, Maryland.

The Travilah Oak is believed to be over 330 years old. According to January 2021 measurements by the Maryland Big Tree Program, the Travilah Oak has a circumference of 19 ft 1 in (5.82 m), a height of 78 ft (24 m), and a crown that stretches 110 ft (34 m) in all directions.

== History ==
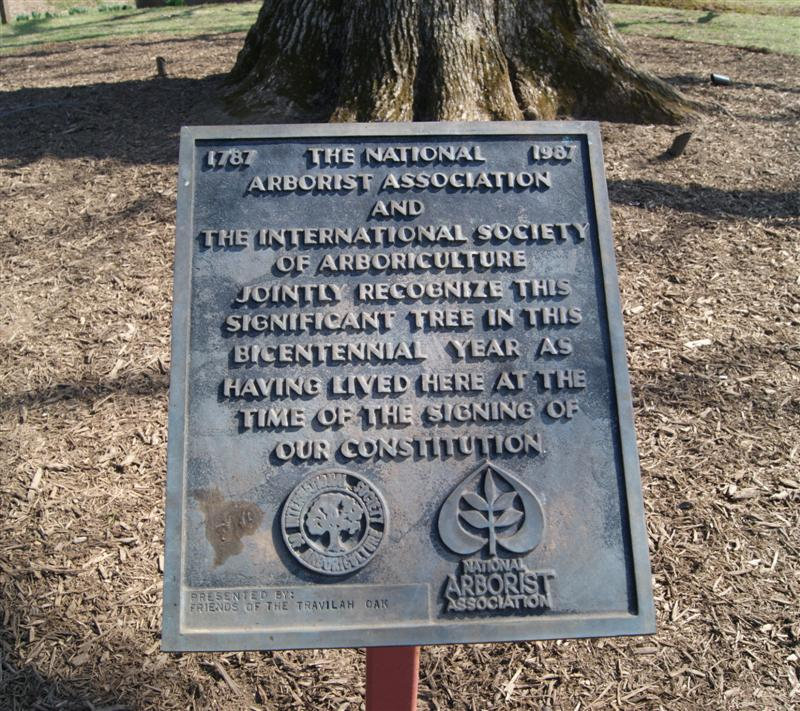
A plaque stands underneath the Travilah Oak recognizing its historical significance

The Travilah Oak, and the community it resides in, was named after the first post master of the area, Travilah Clagett. The shopping center next to the oak was built in 1979. In 1989 the tree received local attention when it was in danger of being cut down because of development. In 1997, Friends of the Travilah Oak joined together with the goal of protecting the tree and preserving it for posterity. The group coordinated with Hopkins and Porter Construction, Inc. to build a fence, patio, and seating area around the large oak. Today the floodlights illuminate the oak at night and lightning rods protect it from thunderstorms.

=== Travilah Oak Celebration ===
The large oak has become the site and focus of the annual Travilah Oak Celebration. Every Fall the community gathers together to celebrate the Travilah Oak's birthday. The goal of the celebration is to raise awareness of the community's heritage. The event features hay rides, vaulting demonstrations on horseback, traditional music, scarecrow building, a pumpkin decorating contest, a magician, vintage cars, Indian dance, karate demonstrations, hands-on nature activities, and more.

=== Candidate for Maryland State Tree ===
Since the felling of the Wye Oak in June 2002 and Flora's Oak in June 2008, there is an opening for the Maryland State Tree. Although the Travilah Oak is not the oldest or largest White Oak in Maryland, it is one of the healthiest making it a good long term candidate.

=== Travilah Oak Queen ===
In 2012, Ms. Rene Shaw was crowned Travilah Oak Queen.
