= Ron P. Swegman =

American angler, artist, and author (born 1967)

Ron P. Swegman (born August 12, 1967) is an American angler, artist, and author. His work includes the illustrated essay collections Philadelphia on the Fly: Tales of an Urban Angler (Frank Amato Publications, 2005) and Small Fry: The Lure of the Little (The Whitefish Press, 2009). His writing primarily explores those times and places when and where nature and the city intersect.

== Early life and education ==
Swegman was born in Pittsburgh, Pennsylvania and attended Pennsylvania State University, where, as an undergraduate, he wrote and edited for the university's newspaper, the Daily Collegian.

== Career ==
A post-baccalaureate fellowship at The Poynter Institute steered him toward incorporating illustrations into his writing projects. He settled in Philadelphia, Pennsylvania, freelancing fiction, journalism, and poetry, much of which appeared in the Zine movement during the 1990s. A broadside, museum of buildings: poems, was published in 1998.

His first full-length book, Philadelphia on the Fly (2005), introduced a new generation of American outdoor writing with a new set of interests and values: urban angling in the shadow of city skylines; mountain biking to regional fishing destinations; birding as a guide to the fish; and poetic prose writing to describe the practical "How To" strategies for luring fish to the artificial fly. His second, Small Fry: The Lure of the Little (2009), portrays these same themes on a broader geographical canvas.

A noted authority on Tenkara fishing, the Japanese fly casting style, Swegman is a contributing writer to several publications, including Eastern Fly Fishing, The Fisherman, The Flyfish Journal, and Tenkara Magazine. Native and invasive urban plants are also documented in his ongoing online project: "Wildflowers of the West Village" - documenting urban nature in New York City. He has resided there since 2009.

=== Snakehead controversy ===
The alleged appearance of the northern snakehead (Channa argus) in Central Park's lakes in April–May 2013 brought renewed international attention to the problem of invasive species in urban waterways. Swegman's angling writings were cited by The New York Times and segments on The Today Show. Other publications followed, including The Drake, New York Observer and The Australian

== Works ==
=== Nonfiction ===
- Philadelphia on the Fly: Tales of an Urban Angler (2005)
- Small Fry: The Lure of the Little (2009)

=== Poetry ===
- museum of buildings: poems (1998)
