= Serpentine Barrens Conservation Park =

Coordinates: 39.070°N 77.235°W

Serpentine Barrens Conservation Park is the name of two protected areas in Montgomery County, Maryland. They cover a total of 288 acres, and protect rare serpentine ecosystems.

The park soils are mapped as a complex association of Chrome, Conowingo and Travilah soil series, all of which are strongly influenced by the serpentine bedrock.
