= White Flint =

White Flint may refer to:

- North Bethesda station, a Washington Metro station in Montgomery County, Maryland, formerly named White Flint station
- White Flint Mall, a former shopping mall in Montgomery County, Maryland
- An urbanized neighborhood in North Bethesda surrounding the Washington Metro station formerly named White Flint
