= North Bethesda Market =

Mixed-use development in North Bethesda, Maryland, US

Coordinates: 39°2′34″N 77°6′45″W

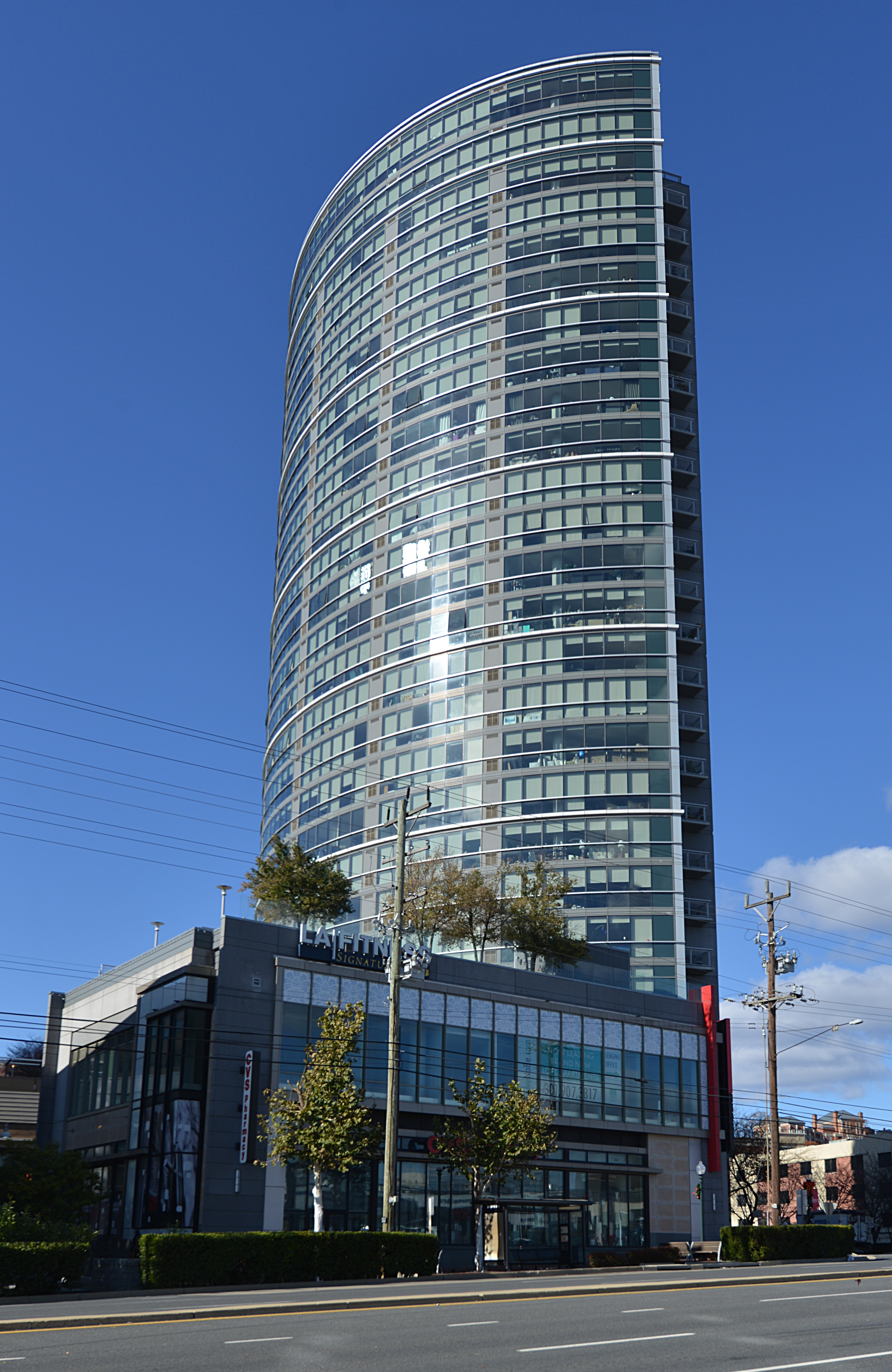
North Bethesda Market East, North Bethesda, MD

North Bethesda Market is a property majority-owned by Capri Capital Partners. The JBG Companies were minority owners of the property until 2014 when Capri Capital Partners purchased the remaining 10% stake from JBG, who also managed the property. In 2014 the Bozzuto Management Company took over retail and residential management of the property, a title previously held by JBG.

== Points of Interest ==
North Bethesda Market is a mixed-use project including retail, restaurants, and residences, located on Maryland Route 355 (aka Rockville Pike) across from the White Flint Mall in North Bethesda, Maryland. North Bethesda Market includes the tallest building in Montgomery County, Maryland. There are plans for a second phase of development, dubbed North Bethesda Market II, which was to include an even taller apartment building, however those plans were scaled back in 2023 and now include a seven-story building and a single story building.

North Bethesda Market includes an LA Fitness, Arhaus, Brio Tuscan Grille, CVS, Seasons 52, Starbucks, and Whole Foods Market.

The North Bethesda Metro station is two blocks from this location.
