= Federal Realty Investment Trust =

Real Estate Investment Trust in the United States

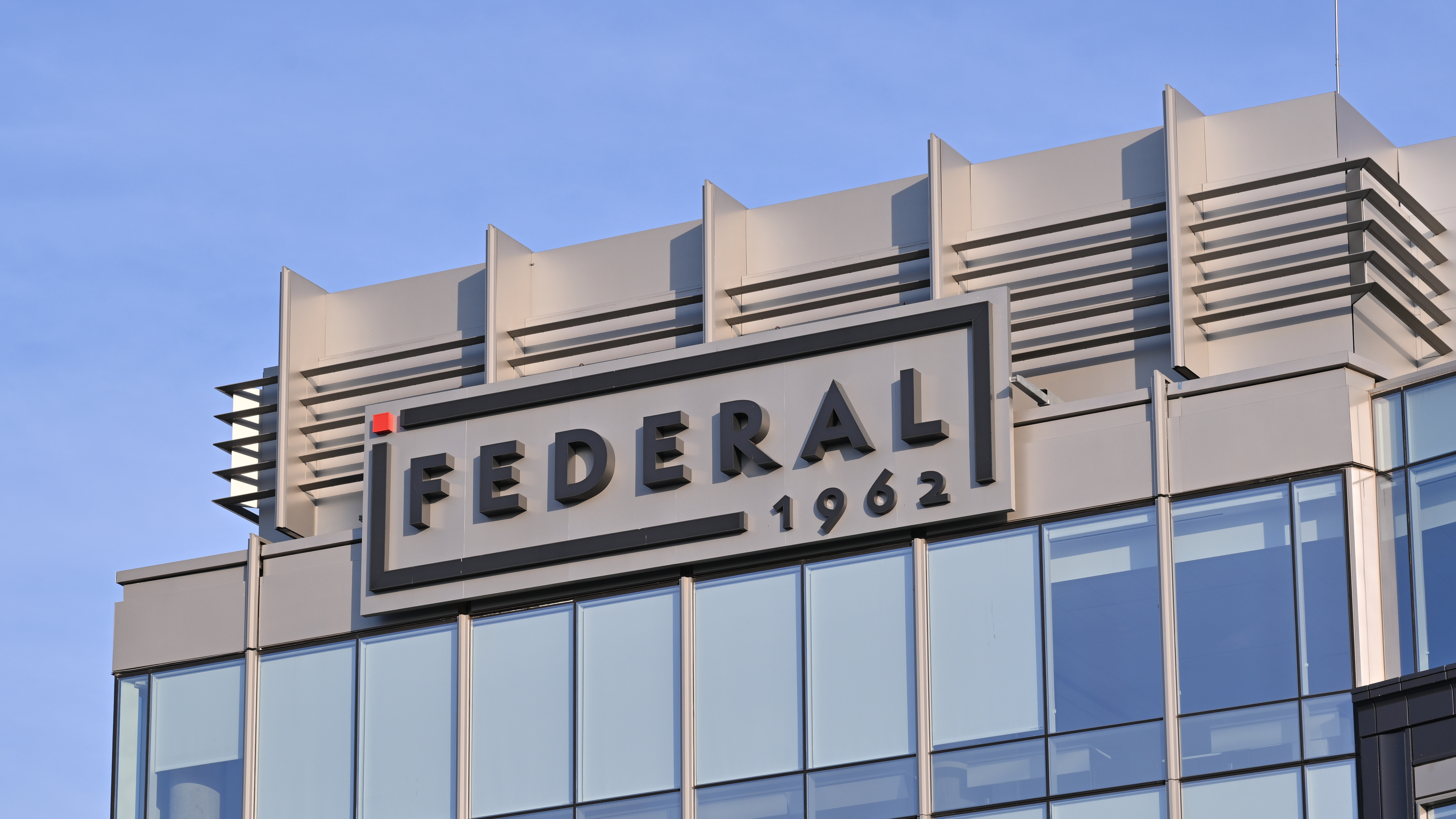
- Type: Public
- Traded as: NYSE: FRT; S&P 500 component
- Industry: Real estate investment trust
- Founded: 1962; 64 years ago
- Founder: Samuel J. Gorlitz
- Headquarters: Rockville, Maryland, U.S.
- Key people: David Faeder (Chairman); Donald C. Wood (CEO & President); Daniel Guglielmone (CFO)
- Products: Shopping centers
- Revenue: ▲US$1.28 billion (2025)
- Net income: ▲US$411 million (2025)
- Total assets: ▲US$9.13 billion (2025)
- Total equity: ▲US$3.25 billion (2025)
- Number of employees: 315 (2021)
- Website: federalrealty.com

Federal Realty Investment Trust is a real estate investment trust that invests in shopping centers in the Northeastern United States, the Mid-Atlantic states, California, and South Florida.

== Investments ==
As of December 31, 2021, the company owned interests in 104 shopping centers containing 25.1 million square feet.

Notable properties owned by the company include:

| Property Name | Location |
|---|---|
| Santana Row | San Jose, California |
| Westgate Center | San Jose, California |
| The Shops at Sunset Place | South Miami, Florida |
| The Grove at Shrewsbury | Shrewsbury, New Jersey |
| Assembly Square | Somerville, Massachusetts |
| Third Street Promenade | Santa Monica, California |
| Grossmont Center | La Mesa, California |
| Pike & Rose | North Bethesda, Maryland |
| CocoWalk | Miami, Florida |
| The Village at Shirlington | Arlington, Virginia |

== History ==
In 1962, the company was founded by Samuel J. Gorlitz in Washington, D.C. In 1999, the company was reorganized as a real estate investment trust in Maryland. In 2007, founder Samuel J. Gorlitz died. In 2015, the company acquired an 85% interest in The Shops at Sunset Place based on a property valuation of $110.2 million. In 2021, the company acquired a 60% ownership stake in Grossmont Center in La Mesa, California worth $175 million.
