= Hold Everything =

Hold Everything may refer to:

- Hold Everything!, a 1928 Broadway musical
- Hold Everything (film), a 1930 musical comedy film photographed on two-color Technicolor
- Hold Everything (store), a defunct retail chain (1985–2006)
- Hold Everything (TV series), a 1961 Australian television series
- Hold Everything!, a short-lived hidden camera American game show, hosted by Pat Bullard, that aired in syndication in 1990.
