= American Kidney Fund =

US non-profit organization

- Founded: 1971
- Purpose: Kidney dialysis Organ transplantation Disease prevention
- Location: Rockville, Maryland
- Region served: United States, Canada
- Method: Educational programs; grants for health insurance premiums, transportation, and prescription drugs; summer enrichment programs for children; advocacy for innovation, etc.
- Key people: Ms. LaVarne A. Burton, President and CEO
- Revenue: $298,438,000 (2018)
- Expenses: $294,646,000 (2018)
- Website: www.kidneyfund.org

The American Kidney Fund (AKF) is a publicly supported non-profit organization founded in 1971.

The AKF provides comprehensive programs of kidney health awareness, education, and prevention. It provides financial assistance that helps 1 out of every 5 U.S. dialysis patients to access health care. In 2016, the American Kidney Fund provided treatment-related grant assistance to more than 98,000 low-income dialysis patients in 50 states, and provided free kidney health screenings in cities across the country.

== Organization ==
The American Kidney Fund is headquartered in North Bethesda, Maryland (with a Rockville mailing address).

== Programs ==
The American Kidney Fund's grant programs help low-income dialysis patients to access health care, including dialysis and transplantation. AKF provides grants that help with health insurance premiums and other treatment necessities not covered by health insurance, such as transportation to dialysis, nutritional products and emergency assistance.

AKF also provides disaster relief to assist dialysis patients affected by natural disasters, and provides summer enrichment grants to help children living with kidney failure to attend specialized summer programs. The American Kidney Fund helped over 68,000 patients needing dialysis in 2007: through things like medical supplies, financial assistance like co-payments on insurance, and additional assistance where insurance does not cover necessities for treatment.

AKF provided free kidney health screenings to more than 10,000 people in 23 U.S. cities in 2016. The American Kidney Fund holds large community outreach events, Kidney Action Day, bringing free health screenings and healthy living information to people at high risk for kidney disease. In 2016, AKF held Kidney Action Day events in Alabama (Bessemer), Chicago, Houston, New Orleans, Philadelphia, and Washington, D.C. As of 2021, AKF holds Kidney Action Week, a week of free, virtual sessions about dialysis, kidney disease prevention, kidney-friendly eating, transplant and innovations in kidney disease. In 2025 it will be held from March 3–7.

The organization's public health education initiatives provide information to patients and caregivers about aspects of kidney disease and treatment, along with material on how kidney disease can be prevented.

The American Kidney Fund offers a free online professional education series of courses designed to keep health professionals stay apprised of the best practices and latest information about kidney disease and kidney disease prevention.

== Fundraising ==
The American Kidney Fund raises funds from individuals, corporations and foundations. Each fall, AKF holds a fundraising gala, The Hope Affair, in Washington, D.C., honoring inspirational patients, caregivers and fundraisers who are making a difference in their communities.

== Controversy ==
According to the New York Times, the AKF has favored patients from clinics that contributed to the Kidney Fund, and discouraged other clinics from applying for assistance. Fresenius and DaVita provide nearly 80% of the AKF's funding. According to Tracey Dickey, a social worker, the Kidney Fund sent her guidelines which said that "If your company cannot make fair and equitable contributions, we respectfully request that your organization not refer patients." LaVarne A. Burton, the Kidney Fund's chief executive, said that Dickey had misunderstood the guidelines. In a statement on its website, the AKF called the article "factually incorrect and unfair", and said that they have never turned away a patient who was financially qualified to receive a grant, and that 40% of dialysis providers with patients receiving help do not contribute anything to the AKF.

The U.S. Centers for Medicare and Medicaid Services (CMS) charged that dialysis providers steered patients to private insurance companies, which cost patients more, rather than to Medicaid and Medicare, which cost patients less but had lower reimbursements for the providers. The providers used the AKF's subsidies to help patients buy the more-expensive private insurance, according to the CMS. According to the Wall Street Journal, "The rule took aim at a setup that has come under fire from health insurers, particularly those offering plans on the Affordable Care Act’s marketplaces. Under the setup, dialysis patients get help paying their health-insurance premiums from a charity, which itself gets funding from dialysis providers."

== See also ==
- Dialysis Patient Citizens
- National Kidney Foundation
