= Westgate Center =

Coordinates: 37.29222°N 121.98856°W

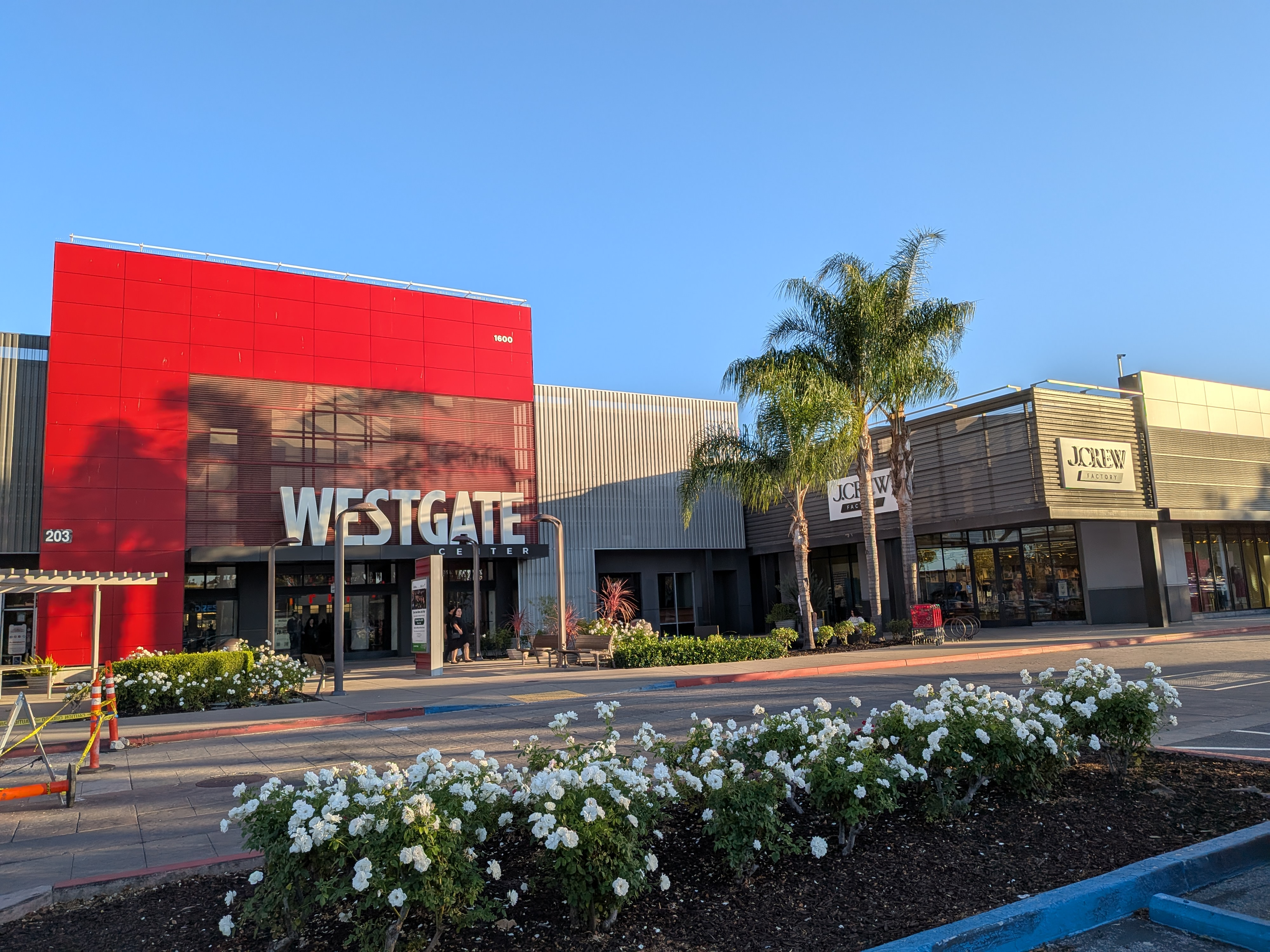
- Mall entrance on the Saratoga Ave side
- Address: 1600 Saratoga Avenue; San Jose, California; 95129
- Opened: 1960; 66 years ago
- Developer: The Hahn Company
- Manager: Federal Realty Investment Trust
- Owner: Federal Realty Investment Trust
- Num. of stores: 236
- Num. of anchor tenants: 3
- Floor area: 640,000 sq ft (59,000 m^{2})
- Floors: 1
- Parking: 7,692
- Website: shopwestgatecenter.com

Westgate Center (or Westgate Shopping Center) is a 640,000 sq ft (59,000 m^{2}) regional outlet shopping center located in the West San Jose neighborhood of San Jose, California, United States. The mall is located at the intersection of Saratoga Avenue and Campbell Avenue. Current major anchor tenants include Burlington Coat Factory, Nordstrom Rack, Ross Dress for Less, TJ Maxx, and Target, along with Michael's, Old Navy, Gap Factory Store, and Nike Factory Store.

== History ==
Westgate Shopping Mall opened in 1960 and rebuilt as current indoor regional mall in 1975. It is owned by Federal Realty Investment Trust, who also own Santana Row and Old Town Center in Los Gatos.

== Facilities ==
Westgate Center, located in San Jose, California is a 645,000 square foot center. While many of the larger stores have their own exterior entrances, there is an interior mall corridor housing smaller stores along with a small food court.

The mall previously hosted a Montgomery Ward where the Target store is now located. Barnes & Noble, until it closed in 2013, was one of 16 stores closed that year. This location is now a Nike Factory Store. Also previously in the complex were Storables, Blockbuster Video, Safeway, Montgomery Ward, and JCPenney. Century Theatres also had one of its domes, Century 25, on the complex at the corner of Saratoga Avenue and Campbell Avenue, before it was sold to an independent group who renamed it the Retro Dome. The group eventually moved and the dome was demolished, replaced by the Veggie Grill.

Walmart Neighborhood Market closed 2019 and will be replaced by Canadian-based Asian supermarket T&T Supermarket in fall 2025)

== See also ==
- Westgate Oxford
- Westfield Valley Fair
