= North Bethesda, Maryland =

- Census-designated place
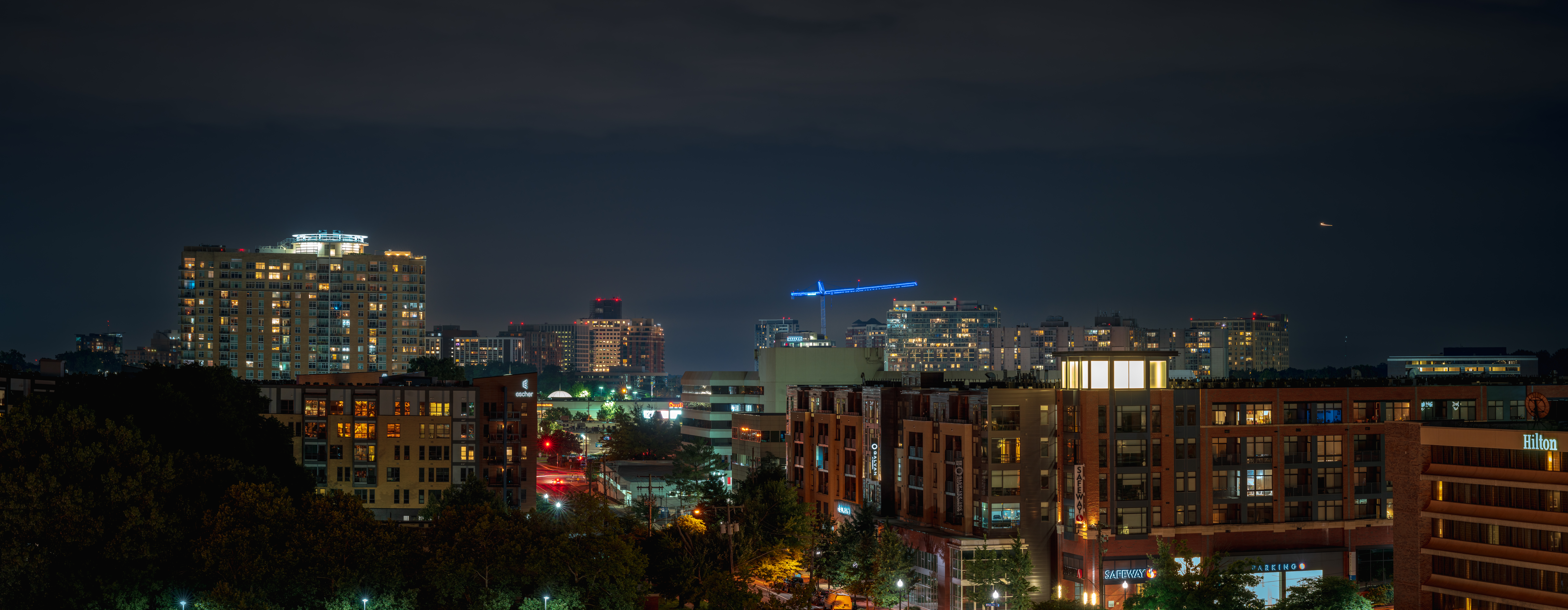
- North Bethesda skyline

- Location of North Bethesda, Maryland

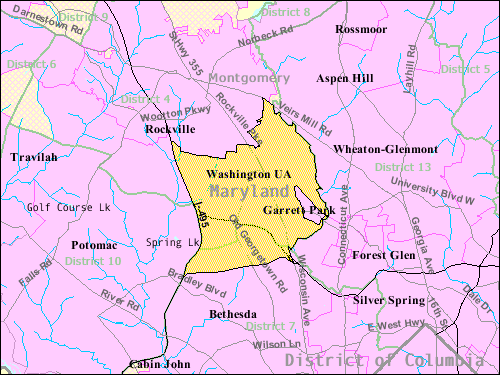
- Boundaries of the North Bethesda CDP, as of 2003
- Coordinates: 39°02′12″N 77°07′23″W
- Country: United States
- State: Maryland
- County: Montgomery

Area
  - Total: 8.90 sq mi (23.04 km^{2})
  - Land: 8.87 sq mi (22.98 km^{2})
  - Water: 0.023 sq mi (0.06 km^{2})
- Elevation: 354 ft (108 m)

Population (2020)
  - Total: 50,094
  - Density: 5,646.1/sq mi (2,179.96/km^{2})
- Time zone: UTC−5 (Eastern (EST))
  - Summer (DST): UTC−4 (EDT)
- ZIP codes: 20814, 20817, 20851, 20852, 20906
- Area codes: 301, 240
- FIPS code: 24-56337
- GNIS feature ID: 2389566

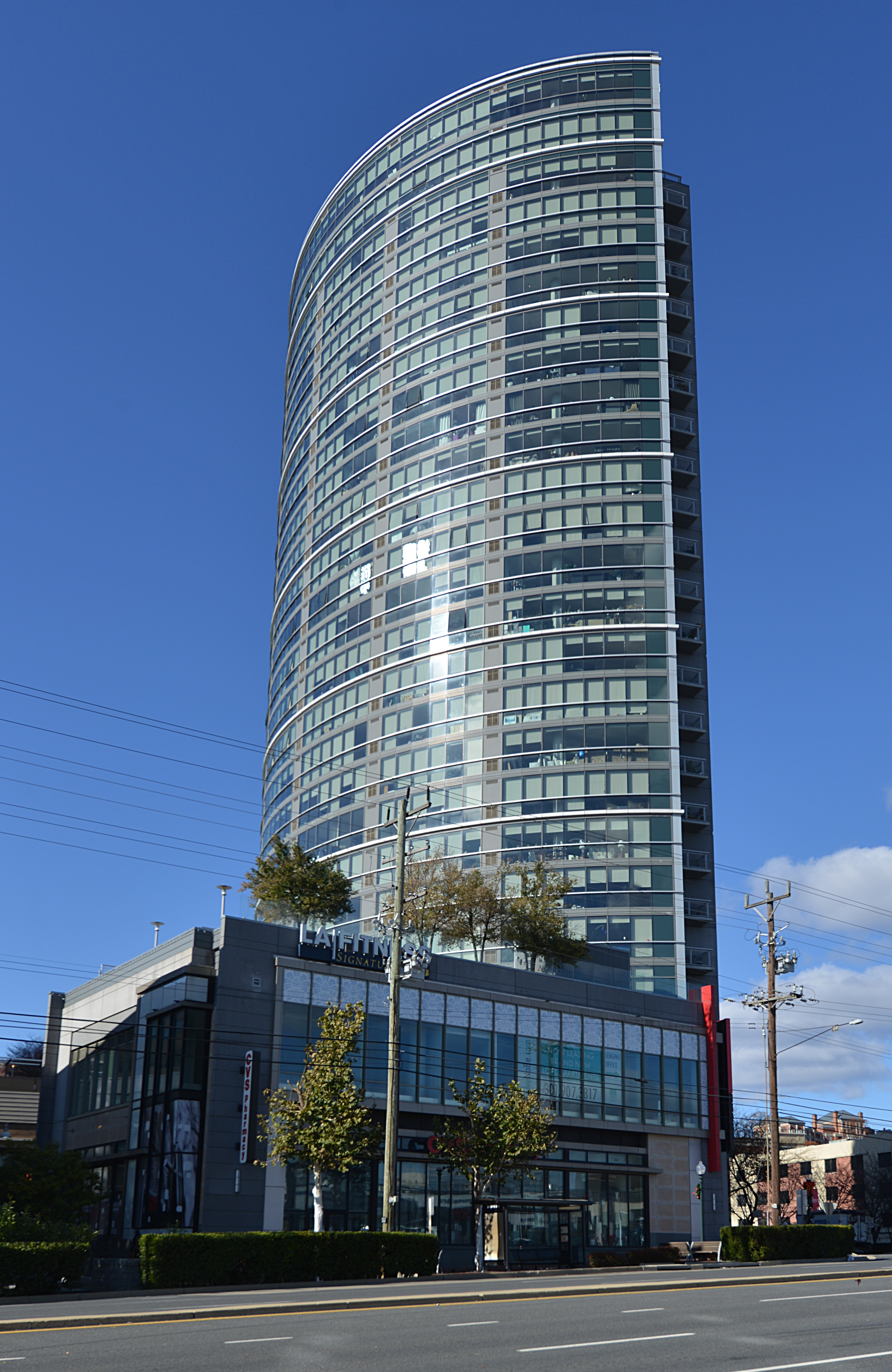
North Bethesda Market East, formerly the tallest building in Montgomery County

North Bethesda is a census-designated place in Montgomery County, Maryland, United States, located just north-west of the U.S. capital of Washington, D.C. It had a population of 50,094 as of the 2020 census. Among its neighborhoods, the centrally located, urbanizing district of White Flint is the commercial and residential hub of North Bethesda. The Pike & Rose development and the Pike District is an initiative of Montgomery County to brand and market this region as "North Bethesda's Urban Core". The WMATA North Bethesda (formerly White Flint) metro station and Grosvenor-Strathmore metro station serve the region.

Four of the National Institutes of Health as well other federal agencies, including the Nuclear Regulatory Commission, the Health Resources and Services Administration, and the United States Public Health Service Commissioned Corps, are headquartered in North Bethesda. A number of corporate headquarters are headquartered in North Bethesda, as well as nonprofits such as the American Kidney Fund, the Society of American Foresters and United States Pharmacopeia (USP).

The region is also known for a number of its long-standing institutions, such as the Neo-Georgian Mansion at Strathmore and the Georgetown Preparatory School. The Music Center at Strathmore is also located in North Bethesda.

== Geography ==
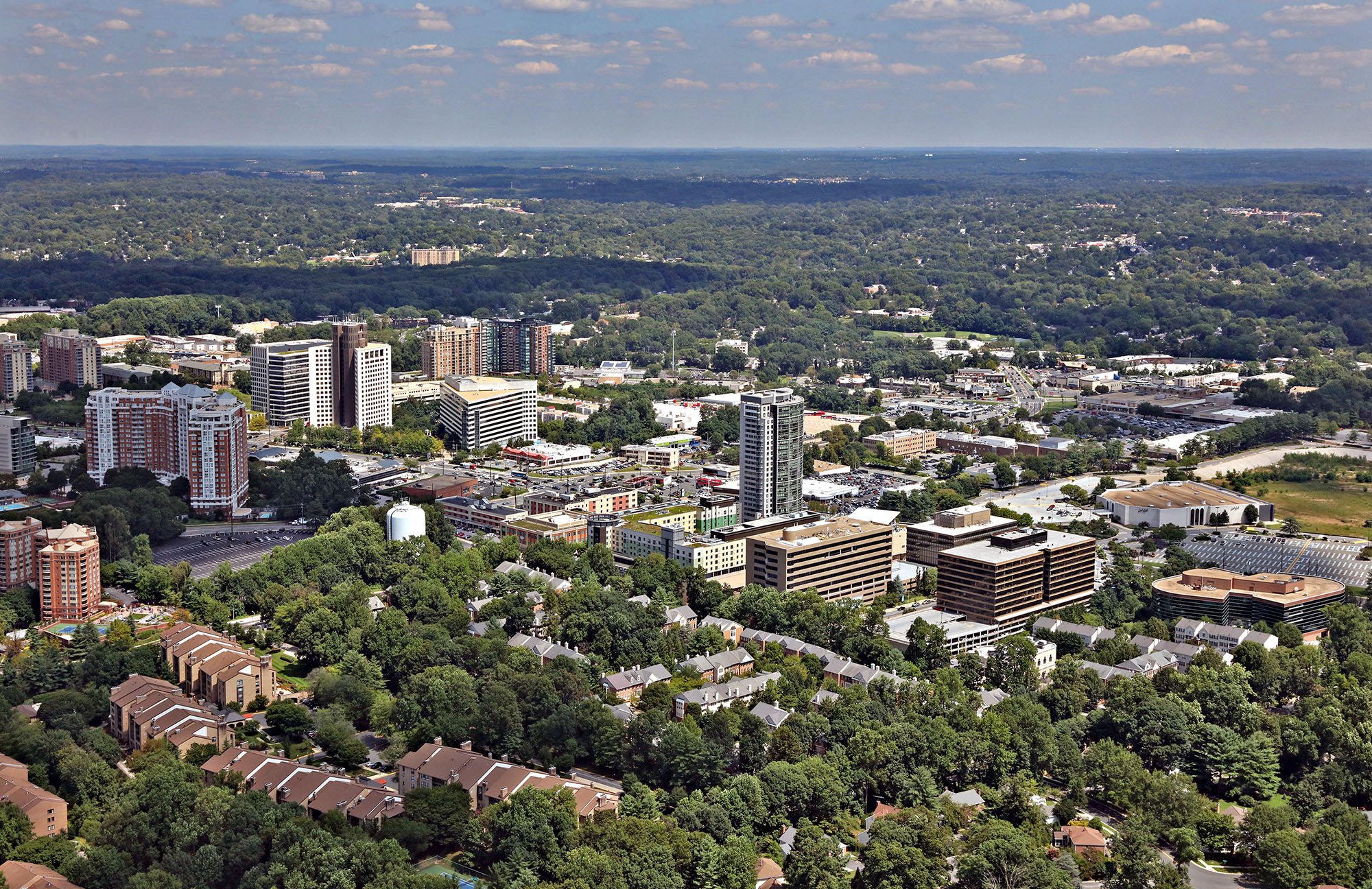
North Bethesda, Maryland - Looking Northeast. North Bethesda Market East visible in center of photo

As an unincorporated area four miles (6.4 km) northwest of Washington, D.C., North Bethesda's boundaries are not officially defined. North Bethesda is, however, recognized by the United States Census Bureau and by the United States Geological Survey as a census-designated place for statistical purposes. North Bethesda borders the city of Rockville to the north, and the unincorporated census-designated places of Bethesda and Potomac to the south and west respectively.

According to the United States Census Bureau, the North Bethesda CDP has a total area of 8.9 square miles (23 km^{2}), all land.

Significant through-roads in North Bethesda include Interstates 270 and 495 and Maryland State Highways 187 (Old Georgetown Road), 355 (Rockville Pike), and 547 (Strathmore Avenue). The Twinbrook, North Bethesda (formerly White Flint), and Grosvenor-Strathmore Washington Metro stations all serve the area, as does the Ride On and Metrobus bus systems. The MARC train services stations in neighboring Garrett Park and Rockville, with a future station planned for North Bethesda as well.

Other landmarks in the area are the Charles E. Smith Jewish Day School, the Kennedy-Shriver Aquatic Center (formerly the Montgomery Aquatic Center), the Jewish Community Center, the Linden Oak tree, from which the metro was diverted from in an effort to preserve it, and North Bethesda Market, the tallest building in Montgomery County.

Major shopping centers include Pike & Rose (formerly Mid-Pike Plaza), Montrose Crossing, and Federal Plaza. The former White Flint Mall, demolished in 2016, was also a major shopping center.

== History ==
North Bethesda shares a common history with most of its Montgomery County neighbors. Archaeological evidence suggests that Paleo, Archaic, and Woodland Native Americans lived nearby, along the banks of the Potomac River. These peoples traveled along an ancient route known as the Seneca Trail (which is today approximately followed in North Bethesda by Old Georgetown Road). Like many ancient roads, the Seneca Trail followed a ridge line – in this case, the high ground between the Potomac River and Rock Creek. Much later, development would spring up along this route.

The recorded history of the area commences with the colonial era. Settlements formed along Rock Creek and the Seneca Trail in the 17th century, with recorded land grants in this area known originally as “Dan” and “Leeke Forest.” The far southern edge of the North Bethesda CDP was originally the country estate of the Grosvenor family, whose lineage includes Alexander Graham Bell and a former President of the National Geographic Society. That region continues to bear the family's name, and is the location of the headquarters of the Renewable Natural Resources Foundation. Also in the southern sector of the census designated area, located in the triangle between the two limbs of I-270 and I-495, is a business district that includes several corporate and government agency headquarters.

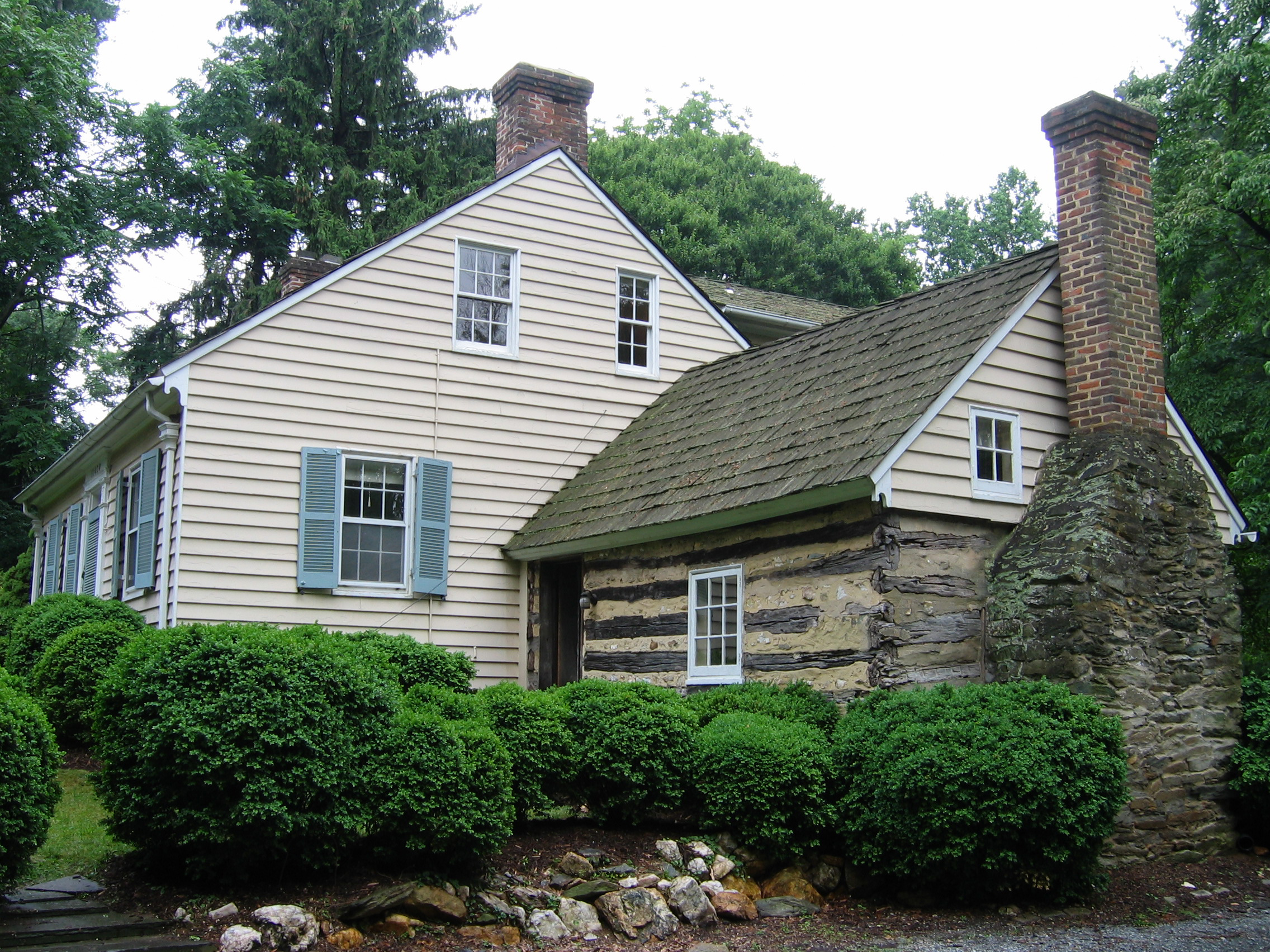
The Riley plantation house and kitchen, located in the Tilden Woods neighborhood on Old Georgetown Road

In the early 19th century, much of the area was part of a 3,700-acre (15 km^{2}) tobacco plantation owned by a slaveowning family with the surname of Riley. One of the Rileys' slaves, Josiah Henson, is thought by historians to be the inspiration for Harriet Beecher Stowe's Uncle Tom's Cabin. In 1806, the Washington Turnpike Company was chartered to improve the old Seneca route, by then known as the Georgetown-Frederick Road. The road was opened in 1828, but had nearly washed away by 1848. The Riley plantation house was located on this road, and the plantation house's kitchen (in which Henson is known to have slept) still stands near the course of this road.

By the late 19th century, the area was privileged with stops along a train route, and by the early 20th century with its own trolley tracks on the line connecting Georgetown and Rockville (along current-day Fleming Avenue). During this time, development bloomed around train and trolley stops, and a number of wealthy families, including those of Captain James F. Oyster and Charles I. Corby (who developed methods that revolutionized the baking industry), lived or summered in the area. Nonetheless, the area remained sparsely populated through the 1920s.

The arrival of the automobile eventually transformed the area into a commuter suburb of Washington, D.C. By the 1950s, the area had sprouted a number of developer-conceived neighborhoods with tract houses for the middle-class.

While some traditional neighborhoods remain, other areas have struggled with issues related to suburban sprawl. Like most other suburbs in Montgomery County, the Maryland-National Capital Park and Planning Commission (M-NCPPC) engages in master planning for all development. The White Flint Master Plan is designed to alleviate negative aspects of future high-density development in North Bethesda.

== Disputed name ==
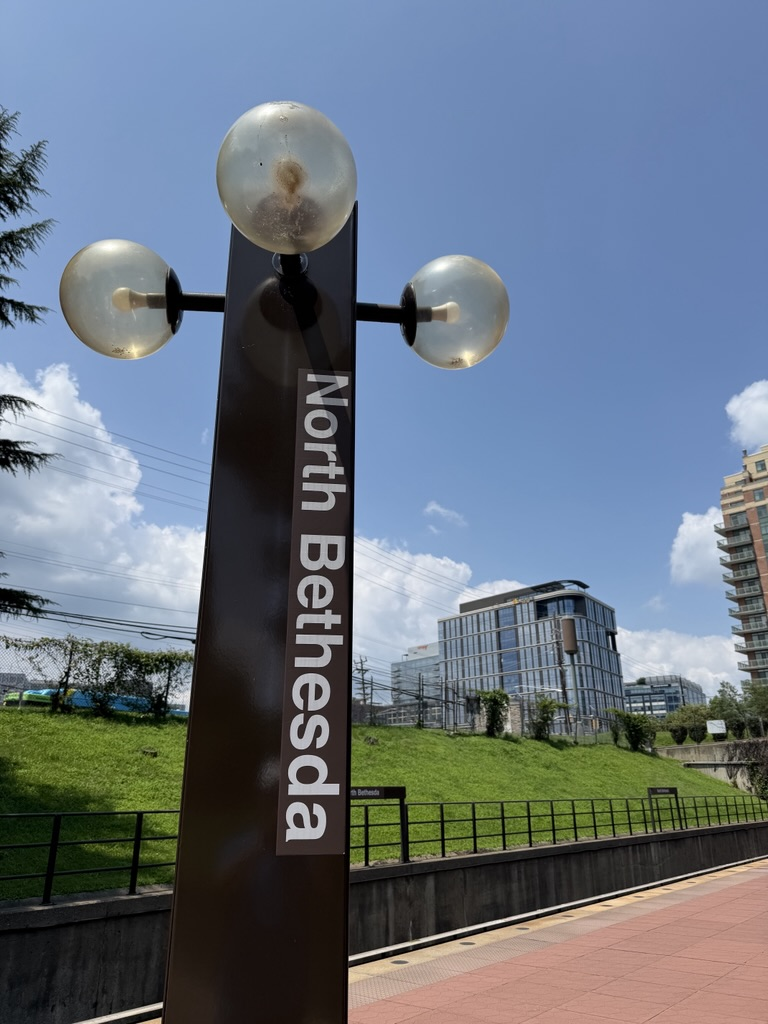
North Bethesda station Metro pylon looking towards 915 Meeting St, home to headquarters for Choice Hotels, Sodexo North America, and JOOLA.

The use of the name North Bethesda for this census-designated region has in the past been questioned by local residents and online commenters. Skeptics have dismissed the census-designated place as just a southern portion of Rockville or the region north of Bethesda rather than a defined place and the name as a neologism coined by realtors to bestow the cachet of Bethesda on a less well-known area.

The reason for the misconception includes its location between more well-known areas, especially as most of North Bethesda lies in the 20852 ZIP code it shares with Rockville and uses the Rockville postal address, whereas the eastern part of the CDP uses the Kensington address and ZIP code, and the southern regions has the 20814 zip code of Bethesda proper.

Adding to the confusion, the county's growth plan for the area was titled "White Flint," the name used by the demolished White Flint Mall and the since renamed White Flint (now North Bethesda) station of the Washington Metro Red Line. Beginning in the mid-2010s, developers sought to rebrand the area around the metro station as "Pike District". In addition, North Bethesda Middle School is located in Bethesda.

Despite the accusation that the real estate business uses "North Bethesda" to associate the area with the ritzier Bethesda rather than Rockville, some realtors point out that customers and agents don't always search for "North Bethesda", and the inconsistency between the place name and postal address can be a liability.

== Education ==
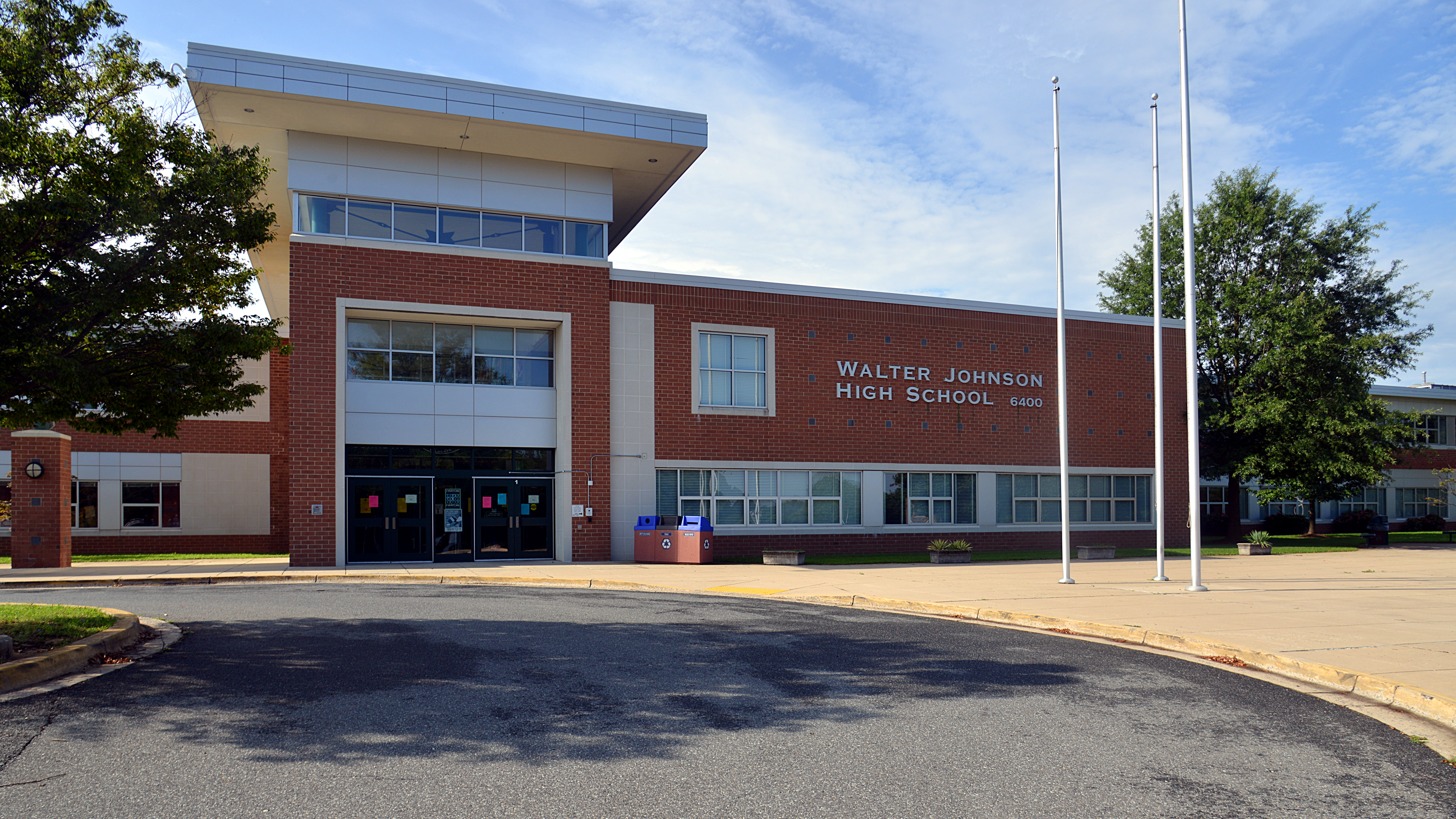
Walter Johnson High School

Montgomery County Public Schools serves North Bethesda. Public schools include:

- Garrett Park Elementary School
- Veirs Mill Elementary School
- Luxmanor Elementary School
- Tilden Middle School
- Walter Johnson High School
- Charles W. Woodward High School (to reopen circa 2025)

Catholic schools (under the Roman Catholic Archdiocese of Washington) include:

- Academy of the Holy Cross
- Holy Cross School - Established in 1961
- Georgetown Preparatory School

Other private schools in the CDP include:

- Charles E. Smith Jewish Day School has two campuses
- Green Acres School (K-8)
- Montrose Christian School formerly operated in North Bethesda CDP.

The Washington Japanese Language School, the oldest supplementary weekend Japanese school in the United States, previously held classes at Holy Cross School and Georgetown Prep in North Bethesda.

== Demographics ==
Historical population
Census	Pop.	Note	%±
1980	22,671		—
1990	29,656		30.8%
2000	38,610		30.2%
2010	43,828		13.5%
2020	50,094		14.3%
source: 2010–2020

=== 2020 census ===
As of the 2020 census, North Bethesda had a population of 50,094. The median age was 39.7 years. 19.6% of residents were under the age of 18 and 17.4% of residents were 65 years of age or older. For every 100 females there were 89.6 males, and for every 100 females age 18 and over there were 86.1 males age 18 and over.

100.0% of residents lived in urban areas, while 0.0% lived in rural areas.

There were 22,149 households in North Bethesda, of which 26.7% had children under the age of 18 living in them. Of all households, 42.6% were married-couple households, 19.7% were households with a male householder and no spouse or partner present, and 32.5% were households with a female householder and no spouse or partner present. About 37.0% of all households were made up of individuals and 11.8% had someone living alone who was 65 years of age or older.

There were 23,230 housing units, of which 4.7% were vacant. The homeowner vacancy rate was 1.4% and the rental vacancy rate was 4.6%.

Racial composition as of the 2020 census
Race	Number	Percent
White	28,008	55.9%
Black or African American	4,775	9.5%
American Indian and Alaska Native	169	0.3%
Asian	8,188	16.3%
Native Hawaiian and Other Pacific Islander	35	0.1%
Some other race	2,953	5.9%
Two or more races	5,966	11.9%
Hispanic or Latino (of any race)	7,355	14.7%

=== 2000 census ===
As of the 2000 census, there were 38,610 people, 17,286 households, and 9,662 families residing in the area. The population density was 4,281.5 inhabitants per square mile (1,653.1/km^{2}). There were 18,071 housing units at an average density of 2,003.9 per square mile (773.7/km^{2}). The racial makeup of the area was 77.24% White, 4.96% African American, 0.29% Native American, 11.97% Asian, 0.05% Pacific Islander, 2.61% from other races, and 2.88% from two or more races. Hispanic or Latino of any race were 9.53% of the population.

There were 17,286 households, out of which 22.7% had children under the age of 18 living with them, 46.2% were married couples living together, 7.4% had a female householder with no husband present, and 44.1% were non-families. 36.5% of all households were made up of individuals, and 11.6% had someone living alone who was 65 years of age or older. The average household size was 2.17 and the average family size was 2.85.

In the area, the population was spread out, with 17.9% under the age of 18, 6.1% from 18 to 24, 34.0% from 25 to 44, 24.2% from 45 to 64, and 17.8% who were 65 years of age or older. The median age was 40 years. For every 100 females, there were 87.3 males. For every 100 females age 18 and over, there were 83.9 males.

=== 2005–2009 American Community Survey ===
According to survey conducted between 2005 and 2009, the median income for a household in the area was $87,324, and the median income for a family was $113,719. Males had a median income of $79,085 versus $61,793 for females. The per capita income for the area was $51,254. About 2.2% of families and 4.8% of the population were below the poverty line, including 5.1% of those under age 18 and 4.6% of those age 65 or over.

== Economy ==
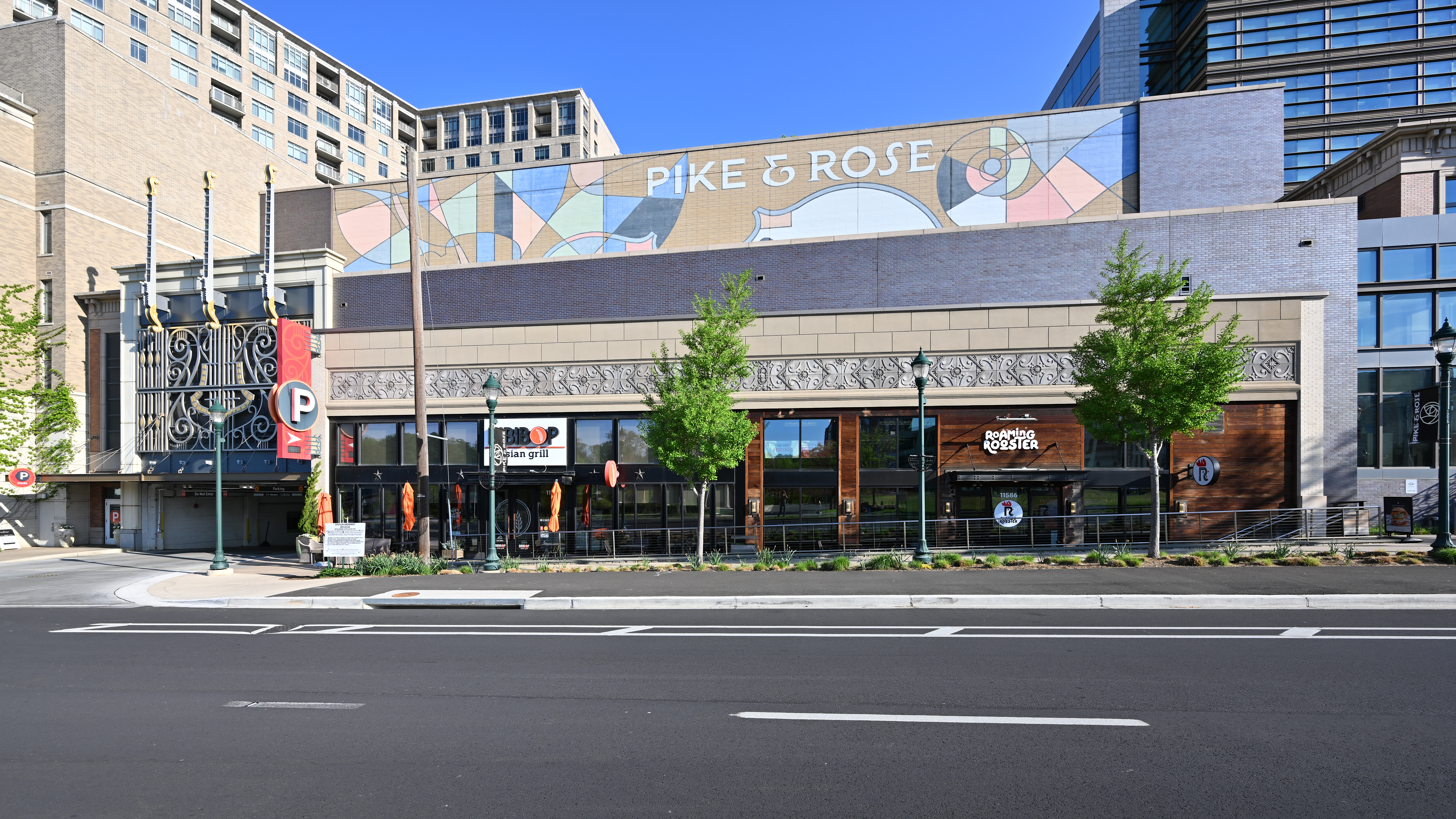
Pike and Rose, one of the major mixed-use developments in North Bethesda

The corporate headquarters of Lockheed Martin, Coventry Healthcare, Choice Hotels, JOOLA, and Total Wine & More are in North Bethesda, as well as the North American headquarters of Sodexo. Four of the National Institutes of Health: the National Institute of Allergy and Infectious Diseases, National Institute on Minority Health and Health Disparities, National Institute of Biomedical Imaging and Bioengineering, and the National Center for Advancing Translational Sciences are also headquartered here. Several units of the United States Public Health Service have headquarters in North Bethesda: the Agency for Healthcare Research and Quality, the Substance Abuse and Mental Health Services Administration, the Indian Health Service, the Health Resources and Services Administration, and the United States Public Health Service Commissioned Corps. Other government agencies based in North Bethesda include the Nuclear Regulatory Commission. Nonprofits based in North Bethesda include the American Kidney Fund, the Society of American Foresters and United States Pharmacopeia (USP). Locally, the Marriott-operated Montgomery County Conference Center, located near the North Bethesda metro station, hosts a number of large national conferences every year.

White Flint Mall, now closed, was for decades a major retail mall here anchored by Bloomingdale's and Lord & Taylor, while Pike & Rose nearby is a major new mixed-use development designated by local planning authorities as a dense hub of offices, retail, hotels, residential and entertainment for the area.

== Neighborhoods in North Bethesda ==
Neighborhoods within the North Bethesda CDP include the following:

- Pike & Rose / Pike District
- Luxmanor
- Old Georgetown Estates
- Neilwood
- Wickford
- Tilden Woods
- Windermere
- Arroyo Estates
- Timberlawn
- Old Farm
- Walnut Woods
- Hollyoak
- Weatherburn
- The Crest of Wickford
- The Oaks
- The Cloisters
- White Flint
- Garrett Park Estates
- Garrett Forest
- Helpine (is Rockville)
- Old Georgetown Village
- Randolph Hills
- Wildwood (is Bethesda)
- Chase Crossing
- Grosvenor Park

== See also ==
- Linden Oak
