= Pike & Rose =

Retail complex in North Bethesda, Maryland, US

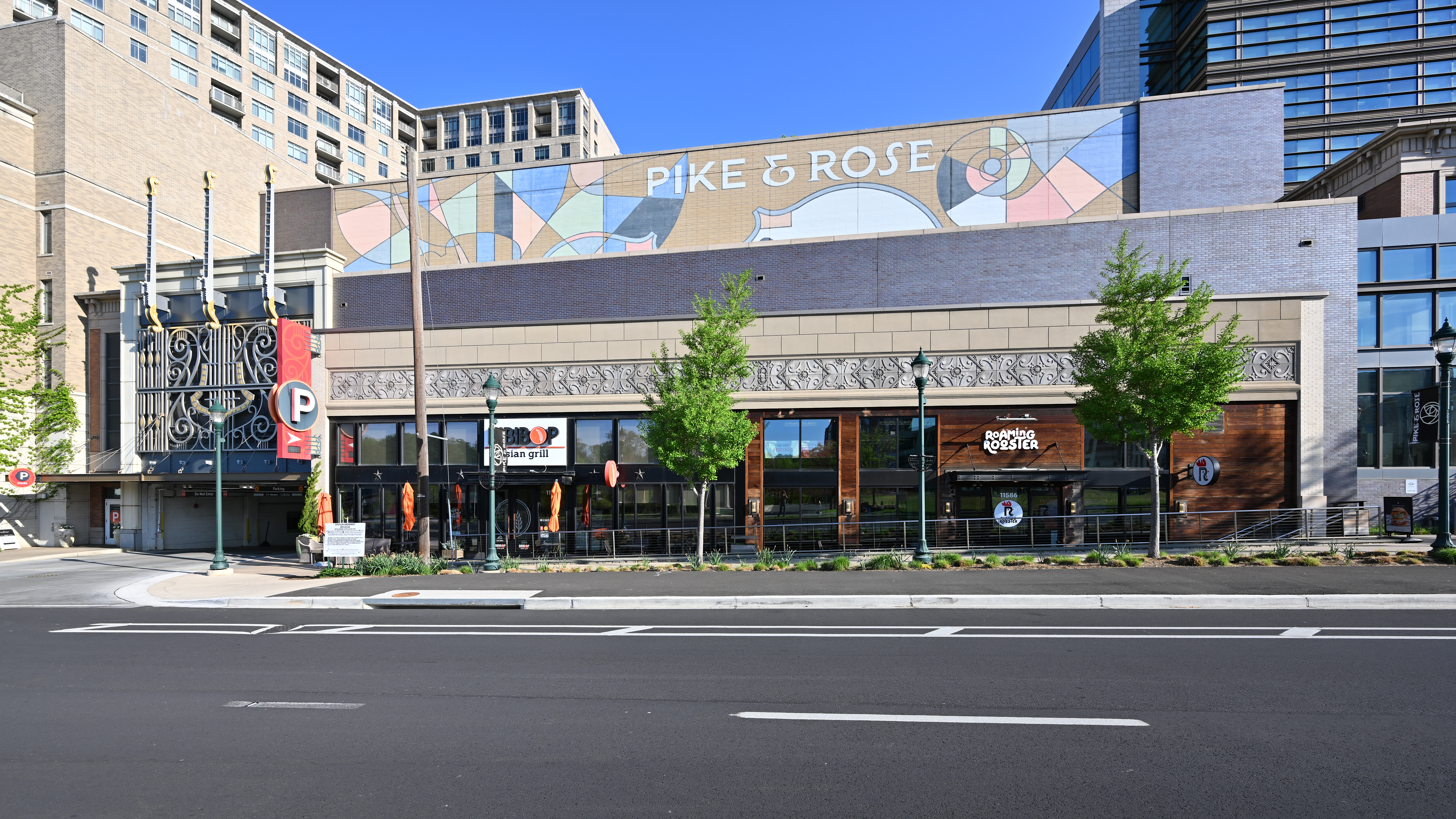
Pike and Rose as seen from Old Georgetown Road

Pike & Rose is a mixed-use development in the form of an ersatz downtown in North Bethesda, Maryland, a block away from North Bethesda station of the Washington Metro. Its first phase opened in 2014. Pike & Rose now comprises 379,000 sq ft (35,200 m^{2}) of retail, 864 residential units, a 177-room hotel, and just under 300,000 sq ft (28,000 m^{2}) of class-A office space. Retail anchors include REI, West Elm, and Uniqlo. Amp by Strathmore, a 200-seat music venue, was adjacent to an iPic movie theater and closed at the end of June 2024. There is also a Porsche auto dealership.

Montgomery County, Maryland has allocated $150 million for the area's development and envisions an eventual 20,000 residential population. The developer is Federal Realty Investment Trust, known for other mixed-use developments at nearby Bethesda Row as well as Santana Row in San Jose, California and Assembly Row in Somerville, Massachusetts.

Elements of the complex include:

- Pallas, a 20-story building, of which the top half is residential and the bottom half is a Canopy by Hilton hotel
- The Henri, another high-rise residential building that has architectural elements mimicking New York City's Puck Building
- 909 Rose, a high-rise office building (tenants include Federal Realty Investment Trust)
- 915 Meeting Street, a high-rise office building (tenants include Choice Hotels and Sodexo)
- 935 Prose, a high-rise office building (under construction)

The development is named after two of the roads that border it, Rockville Pike and Montrose Parkway. Much of the development is on the former site of Mid-Pike Plaza, a shopping center whose original anchor tenant was an E.J. Korvette discount department store.
