= Hold Everything (store) =

- Industry: Retail
- Founded: 1983
- Defunct: 2006
- Number of locations: 11 (2006)
- Owner: Williams-Sonoma, Inc.

Hold Everything was a specialty retail chain in the United States that sold home organization and storage solutions. Its parent company, Williams-Sonoma, Inc., closed the chain's 11 existing stores in 2006.

The "Hold Everything" brand began as a Williams Sonoma catalog introduced in 1983. The catalog's success caused the company to begin opening retail stores using the brand name in 1985. By 1989, it had already opened 12 retail locations.

By early 1991, the chain had opened 24 locations, mostly in California, though Williams-Sonoma, Inc. president Kent Larson forecast as many as 100-150 total stores. Growth continued, and by 1993 the chain had expanded to 38 locations, with typical stores approximately 2,200 square feet (200 m^{2}) in size.

In January 2006, Williams-Sonoma, Inc. announced it would be closing all 11 remaining store locations and the catalog, and moving the product lines to its other stores, including Pottery Barn and West Elm. It was reported the chain's sales had not met expectations and accounted for only a small percentage of Williams-Sonoma Inc.'s revenue.

== See also ==
- Organized Living
- Storables
- The Container Store
