= Storables =

- Type: Private
- Industry: Retail
- Founded: Portland, Oregon (1981)
- Owner: Dodd Fischer
- Website: http://www.storables.com/

Storables is a specialty retail chain that carries a variety of products aimed at helping consumers organize their homes and work spaces in the West Coast of the United States. Its products are categorized into departments including Audio, Baskets, Bath, Closets, Furniture, Kids, Kitchen, Laundry, Novelty, Office, and Utility. The company's motto is "Make Room for Living."

Storables was founded in 1981 by owner Dodd Fischer, who had an interest in the housewares/lifestyle store concept. At the time, the storage goods business was beginning to emerge as a specialty niche in the housewares business, with plastic storage containers and organizers beginning to appear in department stores. The first Storables shop was located in Beaverton, Oregon, outside of Portland, and by 1985 the company had rapidly grown to five locations in California, Oregon, and Washington state. The stores were comparatively small at that time, averaging about 1,000 square feet.

By 1992, the product range had grown to feature additional options, materials, and colors, which required a larger store format. In 2005, Storables expanded into both Scottsdale, Arizona, and Edina, Minnesota, after a competitor, Organized Living, went bankrupt, making the two locations available. The economic downturn eventually led to the closing of both stores, with the Arizona outlet closing in 2009 and Minnesota in 2011. It also closed its California locations in 2014.

After nearly 38 years in operation, it began closing its retail stores as leases expired between January and April 2019.

== See also ==
- Hold Everything (store), chain that closed in 2006
- Organized Living, chain that closed in 2005
- The Container Store
