= Twinbrook station =

Washington Metro station

Twinbrook
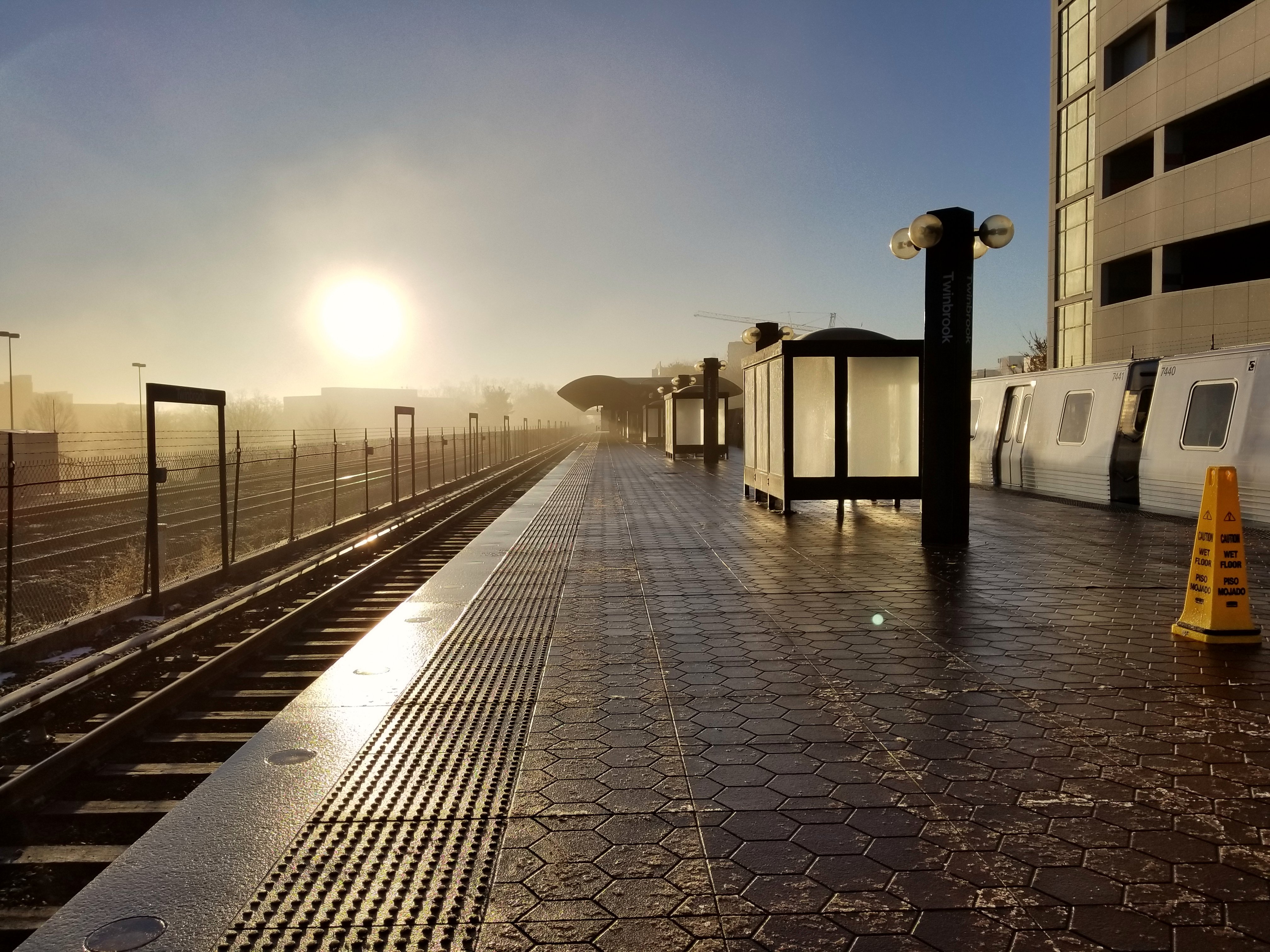
- Twinbrook station platform in January 2018

General information
- Location: Rockville, Maryland, U.S.
- Coordinates: 39°3′44.6″N 77°7′14.8″W
- Owner: Washington Metropolitan Area Transit Authority
- Platforms: 1 island platform
- Tracks: 2
- Connections: Metrobus: M12; Ride On: 5, 26, 44, 45, 46

Construction
- Structure type: At grade
- Parking: 1,097 spaces
- Cycle facilities: Capital Bikeshare, 68 racks and 26 lockers
- Accessible: Yes

Other information
- Station code: A13

History
- Opened: December 15, 1984; 41 years ago

Passengers
- 2025: 2,755 (average weekday)
- Rank: 65 of 98

Services
| Preceding station | Washington Metro | Following station |
|---|---|---|
| Rockville toward Shady Grove | Red Line | North Bethesda toward Glenmont |
Route map
Location

Twinbrook station is a rapid transit station on the Red Line of the Washington Metro attached to the Twinbrook neighborhood of Rockville, Maryland. One of a number of stations on the Rockville Pike corridor, it primarily acts as a commuter station.

== Location ==
Twinbrook station is located in the southern section of Rockville, one of the largest communities in Montgomery County. Specifically, it lies to the east of the intersection of Rockville Pike and Halpine Road, the railway's right-of-way splitting the latter in two.

=== Transit-oriented development ===
Like other Metro stations in Montgomery County, Twinbrook is a center for planned transit-oriented development. The county planning department released the Twinbrook Sector Plan in 2009, which acts as a guideline for mixed-use, walkable development around the station. To fulfill this vision, the plan splits the surrounding area into three zones heading east: a mixed-use urban core area, a technology center, and a light industrial section. In addition, it calls for the redesign of certain arterial roads in the neighborhood such as Twinbrook Parkway and Parklawn Drive as well as connecting dead-end streets to create a grid, aiding walkability. Not included in the Sector Plan is the Twinbrook Station project, which occupies land directly adjacent to the Metro station.

== History ==
The station opened on December 15, 1984 as part of a 7-mile (11 km), four-station northwestern extension of the Red Line between Grosvenor–Strathmore and Shady Grove stations.

== Station layout ==
Twinbrook is served by an island platform west of the CSX Metropolitan Subdivision tracks, which carry Amtrak and MARC Trains. Both the east and west sides of the station have bus bays, surface parking, and kiss and ride lots. These areas are connected to each other and to the platform by a ground-level underpass underneath the embankment holding the tracks. The station is also the only one to have only a single escalator serving the platform, usually heading up. An elevator and stairs provide access to exit the platform area. Southeast of this station, Glenmont bound trains goes into a series of short tunnel, only to emerge into open-cut stations at North Bethesda and Grosvenor-Strathmore respectively.
