= White Flint Mall =

Defunct mall in North Bethesda, Maryland, U.S.

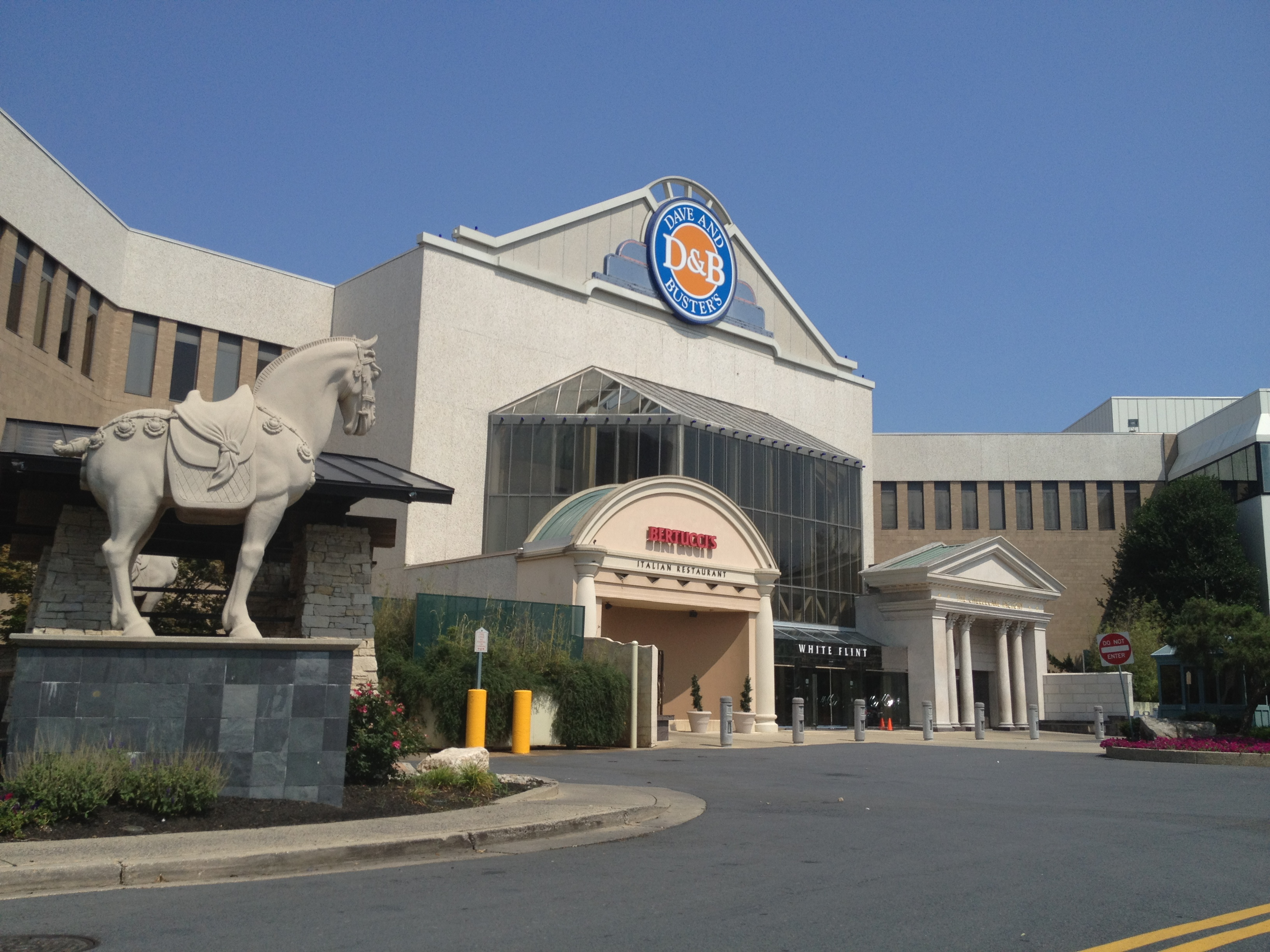
- Main entrance (June 2012)
- Location: North Bethesda, Maryland, U.S.
- Coordinates: 39°2′30″N 77°6′26″W
- Address: 11301 Rockville Pike 20895-1021
- Opened: March 2, 1977; 49 years ago
- Renovated: 2004
- Closed: January 4, 2015; 11 years ago
- Demolished: July 7, 2015 – January 2016
- Developer: Lerner Enterprises; Tower Companies
- Owner: Lerner Enterprises; Tower Companies
- Architect: RTKL Associates
- Num. of stores: 125 (at peak)
- Num. of anchor tenants: 6 (at peak; 2 major, 4 junior)
- Floor area: 850,000 square feet (79,000 m^{2})
- Floors: 3 (1 in H&M and Dave & Busters, 2 in Lord & Taylor and Borders Books and Music, 4 [including a staff mezzanine] in Bloomingdale's)
- Parking: Parking garage; Parking lot
- Website: Official website at the Wayback Machine (archived March 14, 2014)

White Flint Mall was a regional mall in Montgomery County, Maryland, located along Rockville Pike, that closed in early 2015 and was demolished thereafter. Its former anchors were Lord & Taylor, Bloomingdale's, Dave & Buster's, H&M, AMC Theatres and Borders Books and Music, the last four of which acted as junior anchors for the mall.

Lord & Taylor, the mall's final anchor, operated until 2020, five years after the mall's initial closure, and was demolished in fall 2023. As of 2023, the property remains vacant following litigation regarding the redevelopment plans. However, as of August 2025, redevelopment plans have reignited as Lerner Enterprises is negotiating with the county to help fund the project.

== History ==
=== 1972–1977: Development and opening ===
The 43-acre (17 ha) site was formerly home to the Flack family farm, and later the Harper Country Club. After facing foreclosure, the property reopened as White Flint Country Club—a historic country club and golf course—in 1930. The club was named after the distinctive white quartz deposits native to the local soil. The Washington Post described its location as being "on the Rockville Pike, some distance beyond Bethesda".

In 1972, developers Ted Lerner and Albert Abramson acquired the 43-acre property, forming a 50-year joint venture to build an 800,000-square-foot (74,000 m^{2}) shopping mall on the site of the country club, which would be called White Flint Mall. A four-story, 259,000 sq ft (24,100 m^{2}) Bloomingdale's department store would open on February 26, 1977 as their second location in the Washington, D.C. metropolitan area after Tysons Corner Center.

White Flint Mall itself had its grand opening on March 2, 1977, anchored by a two-story, 118,000 sq ft (11,000 m^{2}) Lord & Taylor, and a 20,000-square-foot (1,900 m^{2}) food court known as The Eatery. The Baltimore-based architectural firm RTKL Associates designed the mall, which also featured Loews White Flint 5.

=== 1978–2011: Peak years ===
A third anchor, I. Magnin (the sole East Coast branch of the chain), opened shortly thereafter as a two-story, 40,000 sq ft (3,700 m^{2}) junior anchor in August 1978, but it was slated to close its doors in March 1992 after its parent company, R.H. Macy & Co., filed for Chapter 11 bankruptcy earlier that year. Borders Books and Music took over the former I. Magnin space in July 1993.

Some shopping areas revolved around motifs: Georgetown, on the third floor and Via Rialto on the ground floor, which were recreations of the urban districts in Washington and Venice respectively. The latter was a block of shops and restaurants stretching from the center court to the main entrance facing Rockville Pike, where Bertucci's Brick Oven Pizzeria and The Cheesecake Factory later debuted in the summer of 1994. Both Georgetown and Restaurant Row, home in the 1970s to Intermission Nightclub and Dining Disco, the first shopping-mall discotheque in the country. Dave & Buster's had its grand opening in the former spaces of Georgetown and Restaurant Row in November 1996, as the ninth location in the country.

The mall found creative ways to promote itself over the years. It was the first mall to issue its own credit card to frequent shoppers. To celebrate its 25th anniversary, the mall released its own Monopoly game entitled White Flint-opoly. A renovation was announced in August 2004 after the mall introduced H&M. Over the years major celebrities have appeared at the mall like Donna Karan and Elizabeth Taylor, as well as minor and local stars like the cast of MTV's The Real World: D.C., Brigitte Burdine, Andrea Mitchell, Paula Marshall, Giuliana Rancic and Christine Blasey Ford. The 5-screen movie theater was rebranded as AMC Loews White Flint 5 after AMC Theatres acquired Loews Cineplex Entertainment.

White Flint was a popular destination on Halloween, known for its annual "Howl-O-Ween" event with special trick-or-treating and hosting children's magic shows performed by area entertainers including The Great Zucchini and Dean Carnegie, among others. The mall was served by the White Flint station (renamed North Bethesda station after the mall was demolished) on the Red Line of the Washington Metro since December 1984.

=== 2011–2023: Mall closure, demolition, redevelopment, and lawsuits ===
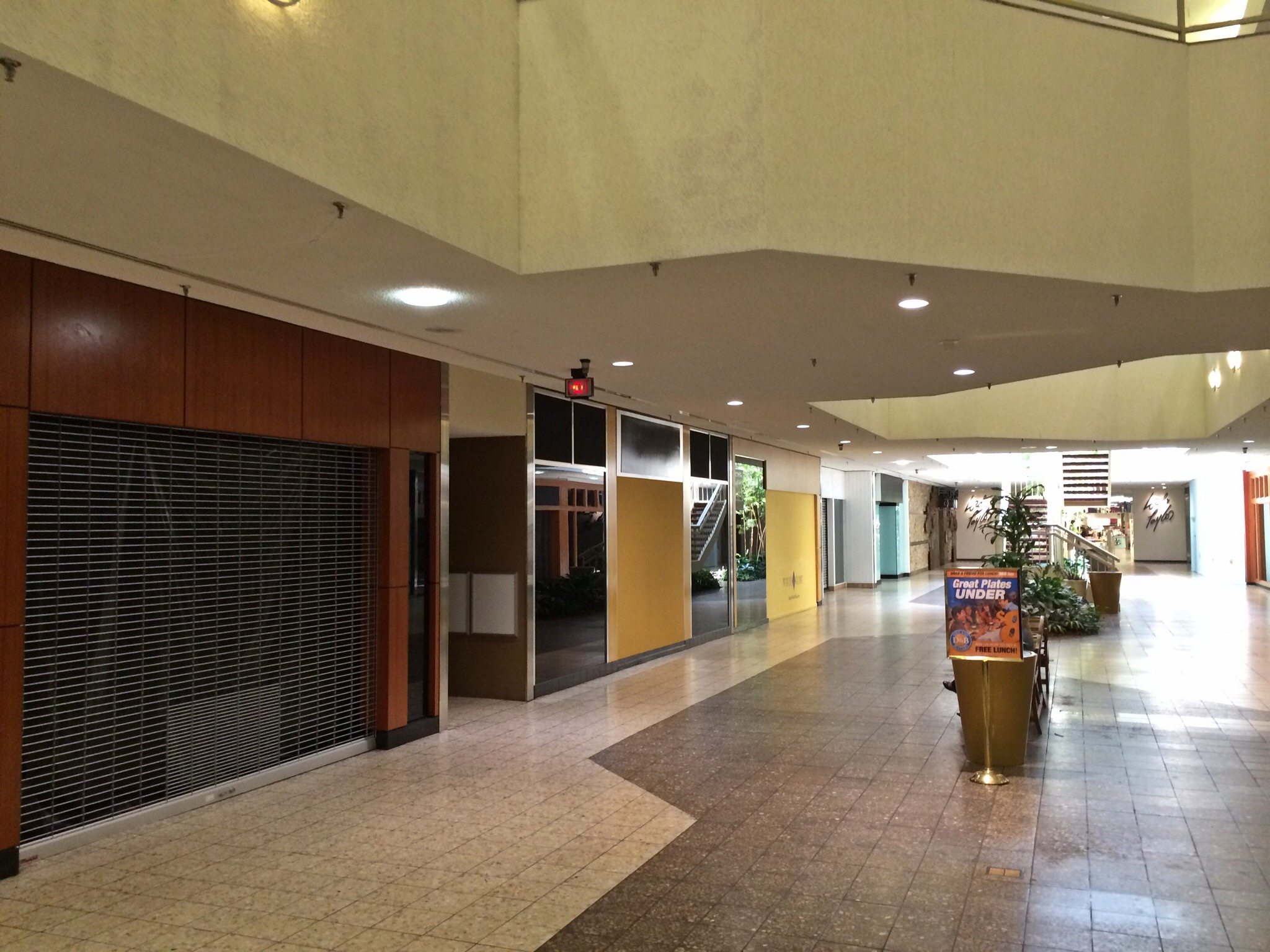
Shuttered storefronts (June 2014)

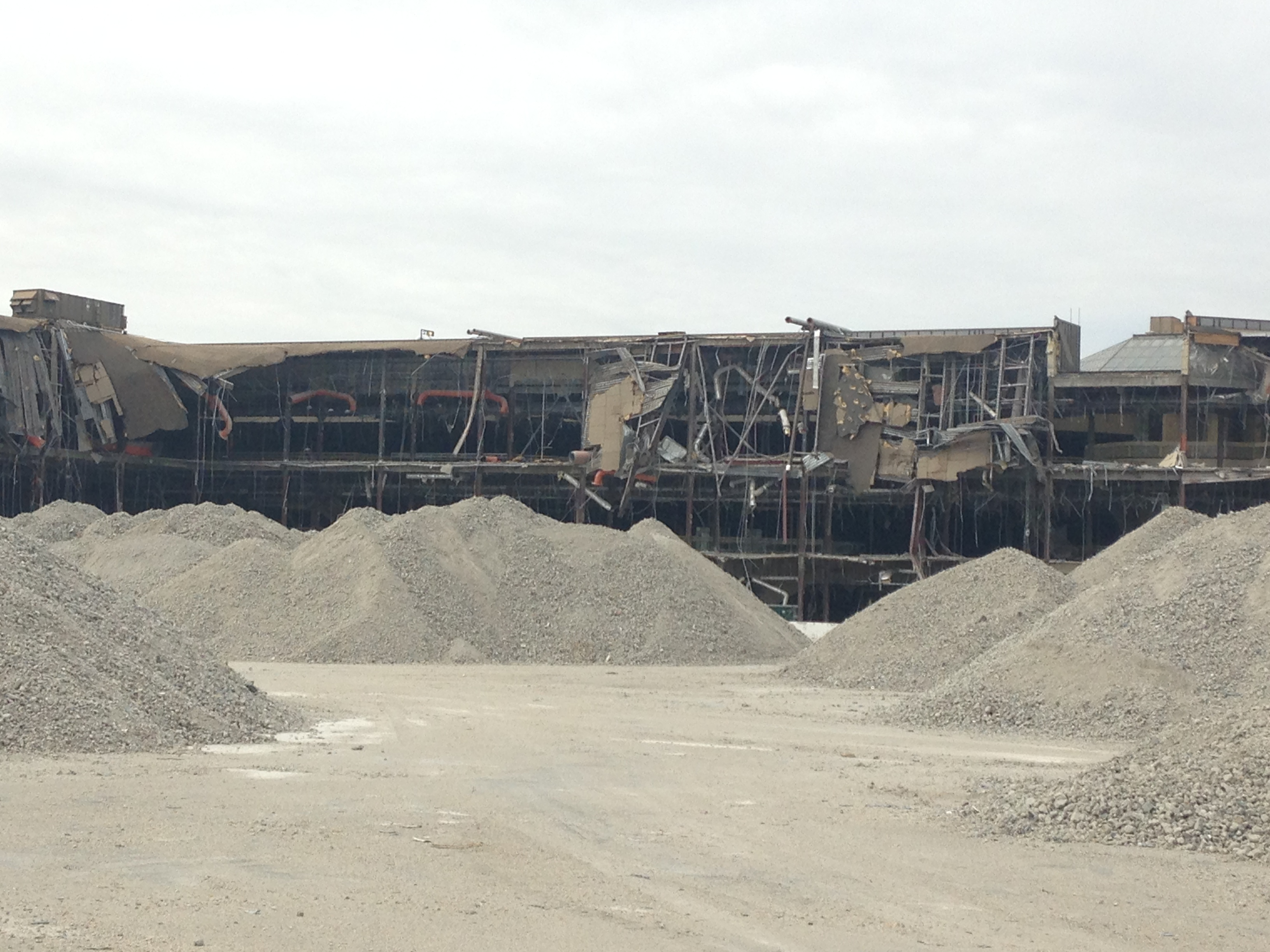
The back of White Flint (where the parking garage and Dave & Buster's once stood) completely opened up during demolition on October 24, 2015.

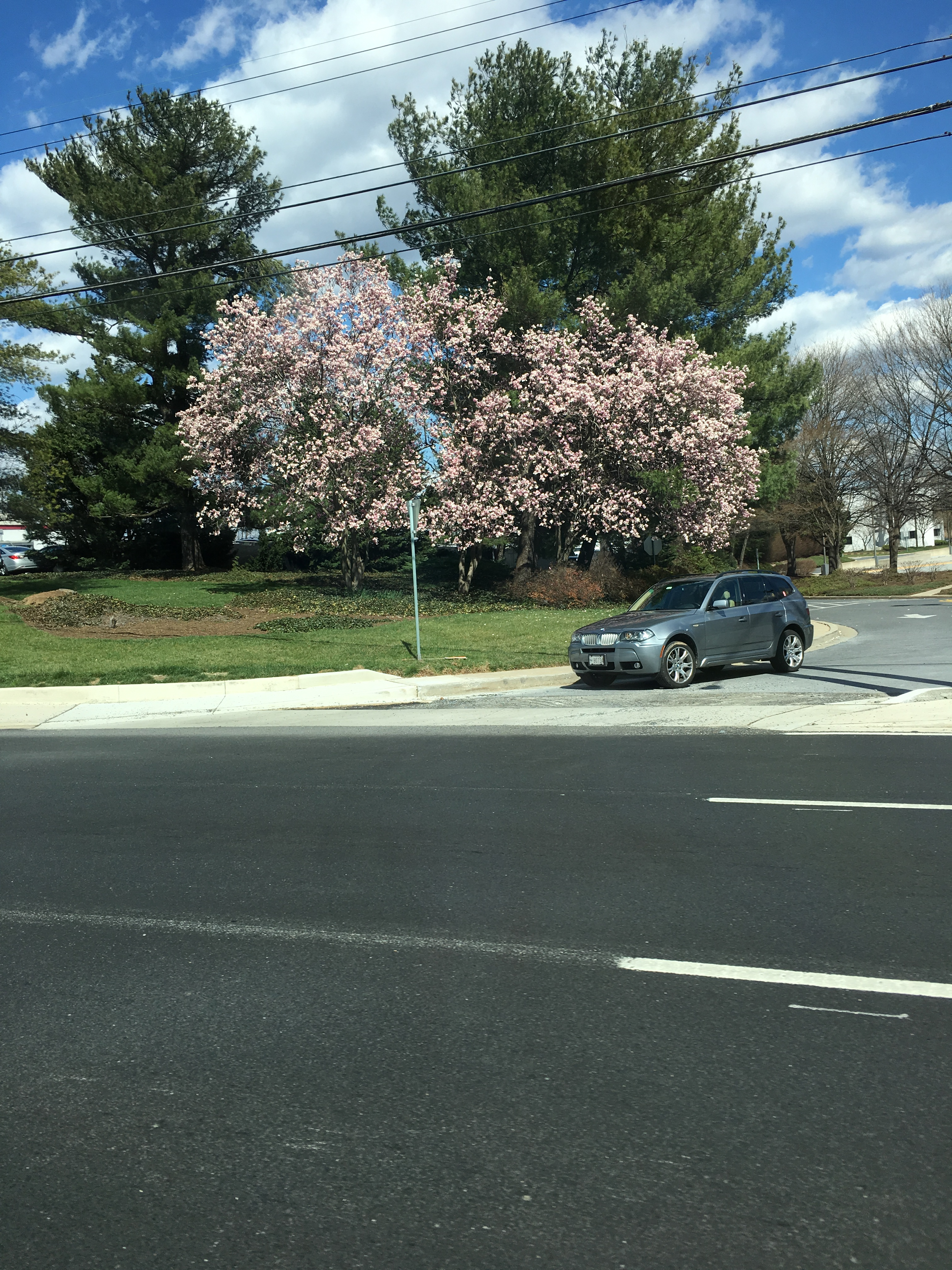
Cherry Blossoms adjacent to one of the mall's access roads (March 2016)

On February 16, 2011, Borders filed for Chapter 11 bankruptcy and announced the closure of three Maryland locations, including White Flint Mall. However, one oddity about the closure of Borders on April 17 of that year was the sign that remained in front of the escalator leading to its permanently shuttered entrance that read "Temporarily Out of Service".

In November 2011, Lerner Enterprises and the Tower Companies announced plans to demolish the 850,000-square-foot (79,000 m^{2}) mall and its large parking garage and replace it with four office buildings, a 300-room hotel, 1,000,000 square feet (93,000 m^{2}) of retail and restaurant space, and 12 apartment buildings consisting of a total of 2,500 residences. The developers expected construction to begin two years following approval and take approximately 25 years to be fully completed. On January 5, 2012, Macy's, Inc. announced that Bloomingdale's would close in March of that year as part of a plan to close five Macy's locations and four Bloomingdale's locations nationwide. Bloomingdale's closed on March 14, 2012, and the building it occupied was demolished in 2013. On August 7 of that year, The Cheesecake Factory announced they would relocate to Westfield Montgomery; their White Flint Mall location closed permanently in December 2013. On December 24, 2013, WJLA-TV reported that White Flint Mall would permanently close sometime in 2014. At that time, fewer than 20 stores were still open including Lord & Taylor, P.F. Chang's China Bistro, Dave & Buster's, Pottery Barn, AMC Theatres, Banana Republic, and H&M. On January 20, 2014, AMC Theatres permanently closed the 5-screen Loews cinema as the mall's operations winded down.

==== Lord & Taylor, LLC v. White Flint Mall ====
It was originally planned that Lord & Taylor would remain through the redevelopment process; however, they filed a lawsuit against White Flint Mall, LLLP (a legal affiliate of Lerner) on July 1, 2013, and went to trial to seek damages on July 28, 2015. On August 14, 2015, the court ruled that White Flint owed Lord & Taylor $31,000,000. White Flint appealed the court's decision; the Fourth Circuit Court of Appeals unanimously upheld the previous verdict in favor of Lord & Taylor, stating that the mall's owners' breached their 1975 contract with Lord & Taylor to maintain the property as a "first-class" mall until 2042.

The appeals court ruled that mall's owners "could not establish to a 'reasonable certainty' whether and to what extent Lord & Taylor would benefit from the redevelopment". The opinion also noted the mall's owners failed to provide the jury with a clear picture of when the new town center would be built, how many buildings it would include and what types of businesses would be expected to lease space in it. The appeals court ruled that the $31,000,000 was a reasonable estimation of lost profits and future construction costs to reconfigure the store. However, this never came to pass.

==== Dave & Buster's, Inc. v. White Flint Mall ====
External videos
- Dave & Buster's at White Flint Mall forced to shut down, ABC 7 News - WJLA

The 35-year 1995 contract Dave & Buster's signed with Lerner Enterprises featured a "radius restriction" clause, which meant that they legally could not open a competing location within Maryland. In November 2005, D&B rebranded the former Jillian's at Arundel Mills in Hanover, part of Anne Arundel County, via a $47 million acquisition, to a Dave & Buster's Grand Sports Cafe. On April 13, 2006, Lerner warned D&B that the Arundel Mills location violated the original 1995 agreement, though they left the White Flint Mall D&B operating. In September 2012, when Lerner announced that the mall would be demolished, they formally ordered D&B to shut down the Arundel Mills location within 30 days.

A boiling point was reached when in October 2013, the mall's operators demanded D&B to vacate the White Flint Mall location after negotiations to close the Arundel Mills location failed. This triggered Dave & Buster's to file a major lawsuit against White Flint Mall, LLLP on November 14 of that year, arguing that Lerner cannot use a 7-year-old lease clause as a pretext to illegally terminate their lease and empty the building for demolition. Lerner retaliated by filing a countersuit against D&B in December of that year, explicitly pointing out that the restaurant chain engaged in breach of contract first by opening the Arundel Mills location.

The battle dragged through March 6, 2014, when D&B claimed in The Washington Post that it would not leave White Flint Mall "without a fight". After the restaurant chain pointed out that Lerner hadn't evicted them four eight years after they opened the Arundel Mills location, Lerner argued that "doesn't mean it can't [evict them] now". To force D&B out, Lerner filed a motion to dismiss alongside its counterclaims, asking U.S. District Judge Roger W. Titus to declare the lease officially broken and grant them the immediate legal rights to evict D&B from White Flint Mall, which was announced on July 26, 2014.

After losing the initial court case, D&B filed its formal notice of appeal on July 30 of that year, having one already filed three months prior. They argued that Maryland's three-year statute of limitations for a breach of contract had expired, meaning the mall's operators waited too long to sue and kick them out for such, and that Lerner had waived its right to enforce the radius restriction clause after spending seven years doing nothing, which also led to the "bad-faith pretext" accusation that they were only evicting D&B now just to move forward with its $250 million redevelopment project. On August 13, 2014, the White Flint Mall Dave & Buster's closed permanently, leaving only Lord & Taylor and P.F. Chang's. Furthermore, D&B's appeal was rejected on June 11, 2015 in a 2-1 decision, with one of the judges arguing that even though the Arundel Mills location was in the Baltimore metropolitan area and not in the DMV, D&B was a "unique entertainment experience", explaining that people would travel across regional lines for it regardless of the metropolitan area, thereby diluting White Flint's potential customer base.

The entire mall permanently closed its doors on January 4, 2015, with P.F. Chang's leaving the same day. Contractors began the exterior demolition of the mall, beginning with the southeastern parking garage nearest to the former Bloomingdale's store site, on July 7, 2015. Demolition of the actual mall building and the remaining parking garages, except the one connected to Lord & Taylor, was finished in January 2016. On August 2, 2020, it was announced that Lord & Taylor would close, which happened on December 28 of that year. In fall 2023, the vacant Lord & Taylor and the adjoining parking garage was demolished, leaving the entire site empty. The mall's original site was one of multiple locations in the DMV competing to be Amazon's second headquarters. Ultimately, the second headquarters was awarded to New York City and Crystal City, Virginia, allowing Lerner to continue its original redevelopment plans.

=== 2025–present: Updates ===
As of August 5, 2025, discussions between Montgomery County and Lerner Enterprises are underway regarding a potential Tax Increment Financing (TIF) structure to help fund upfront infrastructure costs for the long-stalled White Flint Mall redevelopment.

== See also ==
- Owings Mills Mall
- White Marsh Town Center
- White Marsh Mall
