= Dialysis Patient Citizens =

U.S. organization

- Founded: 2004
- Founder: Dialysis and pre-dialysis patients
- Purpose: Working to improve dialysis patient quality of life by elevating the voice of patients with policy makers.
- Location(s): 1300 17th Street N., Suite 580; Arlington, VA 22209
- Region served: United States
- Method: Education and Advocacy
- Members: 28,000
- Key people: Andrew Conkling; President of the Board
- Website: www.dialysispatients.org

Dialysis Patient Citizens is a U.S. non-profit organization based in Washington, D.C., dedicated to improving dialysis citizens' quality of life by advocating for favorable public policy.

== History ==
Dialysis Patient Citizens was founded in 2004 with the stated goals of advocating for self-care, fostering and strengthening partnerships among patients and caregivers, achieving adequate dialysis-related funding, and ensuring up-to-date, optimal clinical protocols.

== Membership ==
Currently, DPC has 28,000 members. Membership is free and open to dialysis and pre-dialysis patients and their families. Members have the opportunity to take part in guiding the organization's policies and mission.

== Organization ==
DPC is a patient-led organization. The Board of Directors is made up of patients currently on dialysis or who have been on dialysis, but now have a kidney transplant. Through membership surveys, DPC members can help set the organization's advocacy and education priorities. Membership can also provide input into the organization's Board-approved public policies. The national organization is overseen by a Board of Directors, which is currently headed by Andrew Conkling. Board members are elected to two-year terms. DPC's bylaws require the President, Vice President and a majority of its Board to be current dialysis patients.

== Goals ==
The stated long-term goals of DPC are to be an organization that plays an advisory role to the United States Congress, the Centers for Medicare and Medicaid Services (CMS) and dialysis providers and that works to achieve superior education for dialysis and pre-dialysis patients.

== Advocacy ==
DPC brings patients to Washington, DC every year and have held more than 1,000 meetings with Members of Congress and their staff through these efforts to increase public awareness of dialysis issues.

== Patient Ambassadors ==
DPC Patient Ambassadors are volunteers throughout the United States who advocate on kidney care issues. DPC educates Patient Ambassadors on how to advocate for dialysis patients through regular Patient Ambassador calls. DPC has held Patient Ambassador Meetings on a wide range of topics including transplantation, Medicare Part D, Medigap, charitable assistance and health disparities.

== State Dialysis Days ==
DPC State Dialysis Days are held throughout the year in various states. DPC Patient Ambassadors, dialysis patients or family members of dialysis patients, and DPC Staff meet with state legislators at the State Capitols to educate lawmakers about matters of importance to dialysis care. DPC has participated in state advocacy efforts across the country.
