= Grosvenor–Strathmore station =

Washington Metro station

Grosvenor–Strathmore
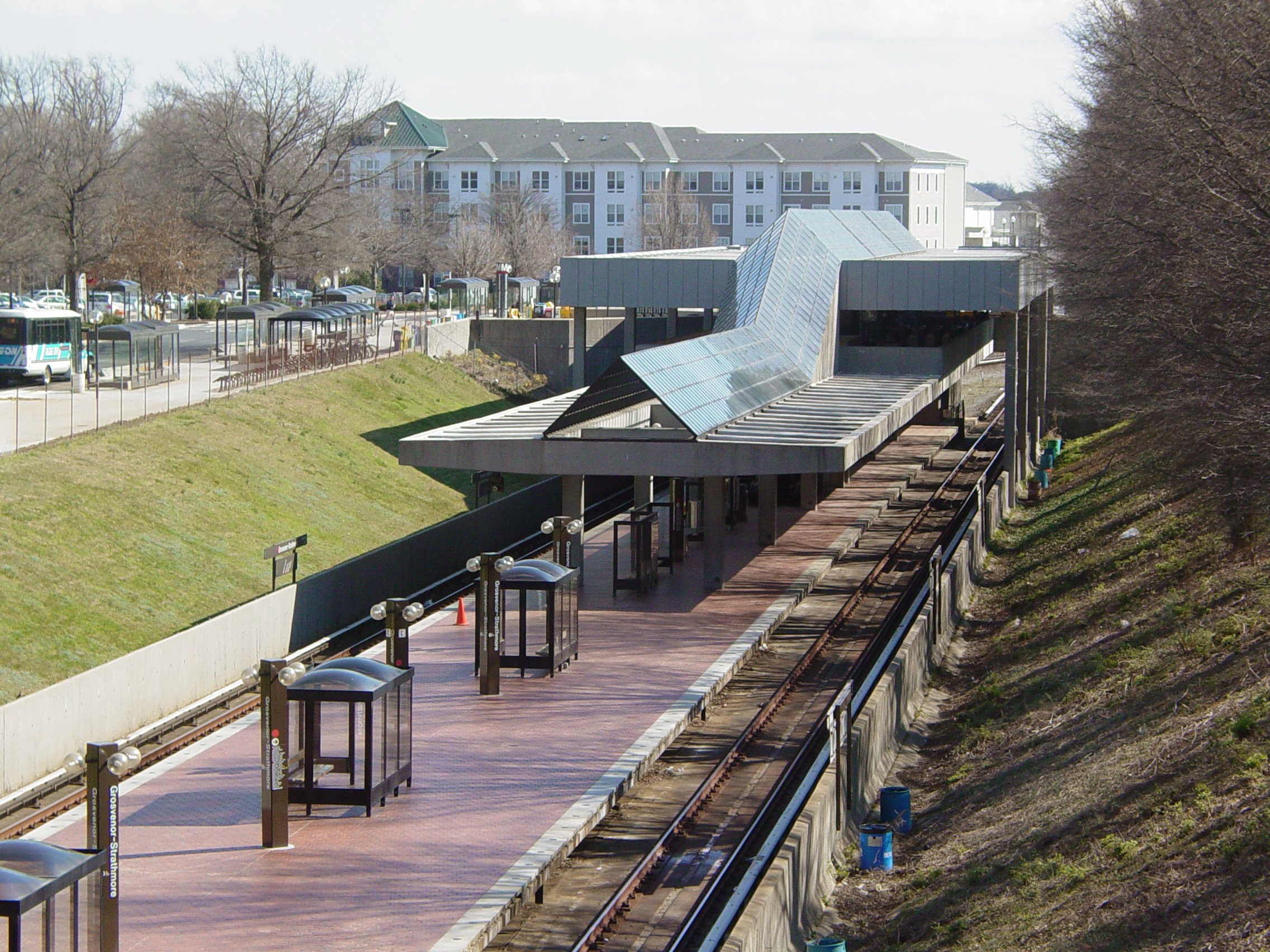
- Grosvenor–Strathmore station platform in September 2004

General information
- Location: North Bethesda, Maryland, U.S.
- Coordinates: 39.029188°N 77.103904°W
- Owner: Washington Metropolitan Area Transit Authority
- Platforms: 1 island platform
- Tracks: 2
- Connections: Ride On: 6, 37, 46, 96, 101

Construction
- Structure type: Below-grade
- Parking: 1,796 spaces including six free motorcycle parking spaces
- Cycle facilities: 40 racks and 30 lockers
- Accessible: Yes

Other information
- Station code: A11

History
- Opened: August 25, 1984; 42 years ago
- Rebuilt: 2026
- Former names: Grosvenor (1984–2005)

Passengers
- 2025: 3,109 (average weekday)
- Rank: 58 of 98

Services
Preceding station	Washington Metro	Following station
North Bethesda toward Shady Grove	Red Line	Medical Center toward Glenmont
Route map
Location

Grosvenor–Strathmore station (formerly Grosvenor, pronounced /ˈɡroʊvənər/ GROH-vən-ər) is a rapid transit station on the Red Line of the Washington Metro in Montgomery County, Maryland. Grosvenor–Strathmore is the last above-ground station for Glenmont-bound Red Line trains until NoMa-Gallaudet U; south of the station, trains cross over the Capital Beltway before descending underground. It is one of a number of stations on the Rockville Pike corridor in Montgomery County.

== Location ==
Named after the nearby Grosvenor Lane, Grosvenor–Strathmore station lies within the unincorporated area of North Bethesda. Located to the east of Rockville Pike at its intersection with Tuckerman Lane, the main point of interest near the station is the Music Center at Strathmore. In addition, it is the first stop outside of the Capital Beltway heading outbound towards Shady Grove on the Red Line.

== History ==
Service to Grosvenor (named for its proximity to Grosvenor Lane) began on August 25, 1984. Grosvenor Lane was located at the 100 acres (40 ha) farm of Gilbert Hovey Grosvenor (1875–1966), the father of photojournalism and the first full-time editor of National Geographic from 1899 to 1954. He moved there from the Dupont Circle area in Washington, D.C. after buying the farmland in 1912.

The station's opening coincided with the completion of 6.8 miles (10.9 km) of rail northwest of the Van Ness–UDC station and the opening of the Bethesda, Friendship Heights, Medical Center and Tenleytown stations. It remained the western terminus of the Red Line until the extension of that line to Shady Grove that December. Trains from Silver Spring terminated here during peak times until December 2018.

In February 2005, the Music Center at Strathmore opened adjacent to the station, prompting the name change to Grosvenor–Strathmore. The arts complex and station are connected via an elevated pedestrian walkway, the Carlton R. Sickles Memorial Sky Bridge. Escalators and an underground walkway were also added to the station to allow customers to easily cross the busy road, Rockville Pike, that is adjacent to the station.

From March 26, 2020 until June 28, 2020, this station was closed due to the 2020 coronavirus pandemic.

In 2023 Metro opened a Bike & Ride facility, a secure, video-monitored covered structure with room for 100 bikes and repair stands equipped with tools and air pumps.

In May 2026 the Washington Metropolitan Area Transit Authority announced that the Bethesda, Medical Center and Grosvenor–Strathmore stations will be closed July 6 to September 6, 2026, to allow for completion of Red Line construction projects. The platform at Grosvenor was reconstructed during this extended closure. On September 7, 2026, Grosvenor reopened on time with the other closed stations.

== Station layout ==
Grosvenor–Strathmore has one island platform located just east of Rockville Pike. Access to the station is provided by a passageway connecting Rockville Pike and a large parking lot and garage east of the station. Bus bays and a kiss and ride lot are east of the station, but there is also a bus stop west of the station on Rockville Pike. The tracks in the open cut continue in a tunnel northwest of the station, and become briefly elevated south of the station before going underground.

There is also a short pocket track just past the station going northwest.
