= Organized Living =

Company selling organization products

- Industry: Manufacturing
- Founded: Ohio (1919)
- Headquarters: Cincinnati, Ohio
- Website: http://organizedliving.com/

Organized Living (former)
- Industry: Retail
- Founded: Kansas (1985)
- Revenue: ▲USD Est. $75-100 million in 2004-05
- Number of employees: ~1000 in 2004-05

Organized Living, formerly known as Schulte Corp., is a company that manufactures storage and organization products for the home, sold through independent dealers in the United States and Canada. Prior to 2007, Organized Living was a specialty retail chain in the United States that sold storage solutions for home and office.

== History ==
In 1985, Mark Ferrel founded the company as Containers Unlimited, in Kansas, with its first location in Overland Park. In 1993, the then-two store chain changed its name from Containers and More to Organized Living. By mid-1996, the chain had three stores (the original location plus two others in St. Louis) and next expanded by adding two stores in Las Vegas, in early 1997. As it grew, the company consciously decided to focus expansion on markets not already served by The Container Store, its primary competitor. As of mid-2000, the chain had grown to 11 stores.

The store eventually grew to 25 stores before filing for bankruptcy in 2005, after planned financing did not come to fruition. After private equity firm Saunders Karp & Megrue bought a majority stake in the company, the former head of Bath & Body Works, Beth Pritchard, was hired in January 2004 to grow the chain into a national presence. Pritchard also moved the company's headquarters from Lenexa, Kansas, in the Kansas City area, to Westerville, Ohio, near Columbus. Pritchard was released in May 2005 during the bankruptcy proceedings. Pritchard cited changes in Saunder Karp's commitment to finance growth as the cause of the collapse.

Schulte Corp., one of the company's biggest creditors, obtained rights to the Organized Living name in the bankruptcy proceedings, and operated OrganizedLiving.com as an online retailer through 2012. On January 1, 2013, Schulte Corp. changed its corporate name to Organized Living and relaunched OrganizedLiving.com as its new website.
