= Red Line (Washington Metro) =

Washington Metro rapid transit line

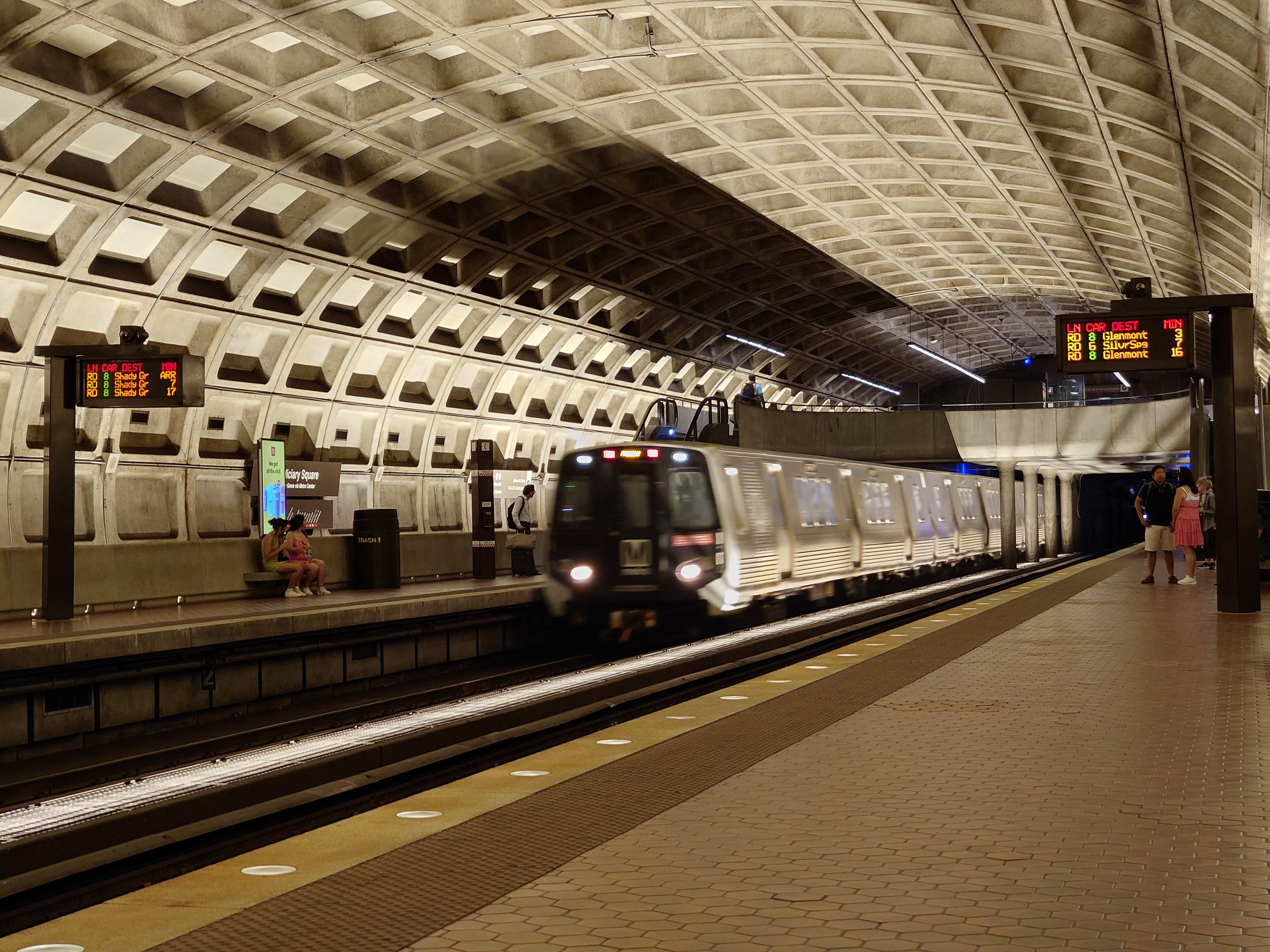
- Red Line train arriving at Judiciary Square in June 2023

Overview
- Status: Operating
- Locale: Montgomery County; Washington, D.C.
- Termini: Shady Grove; Glenmont
- Stations: 27

Service
- Type: Rapid transit
- System: Washington Metro
- Operator: Washington Metropolitan Area Transit Authority
- Rolling stock: 3000-series, 6000-series, 7000-series

History
- Opened: March 27, 1976

Technical
- Line length: 31.9 mi (51.3 km)
- Number of tracks: 2
- Character: At-grade, underground, and elevated
- Track gauge: 4 ft 8 1/4 in (1,429 mm)
- Electrification: Third rail, 750 V DC
Route map
Red Line highlighted in red

Washington Metro system map

The Red Line is a rapid transit line of the Washington Metro system, consisting of 27 stations in Montgomery County, Maryland, and Washington, D.C., in the United States. It is a primary line through downtown Washington and the oldest and busiest line in the system. It forms a long, narrow "U," capped by its terminal stations at Shady Grove and Glenmont.

Trains run every 4–5 minutes during weekday rush hours, every 6 minutes during weekday off-peak hours and weekends, and every 10 minutes daily after 9:30pm.

The Red Line is the only line in the system that does not share its tracks with another Metrorail line. However, it operates parallel to CSX Transportation freight trains along the railroad's Metropolitan Subdivision from the D.C. neighborhood of Brentwood north past Silver Spring, Maryland, and from Twinbrook to its terminus at Shady Grove.

== History ==
=== Planning and construction ===
Planning for Metro began with the Mass Transportation Survey in 1955, which attempted to forecast freeway and mass transit systems sufficient to meet the needs of 1980. In 1959, the study's final report recommended two rapid transit lines which anticipated subways in downtown Washington. Because the plan called for extensive freeway construction within the District of Columbia, alarmed residents lobbied for federal legislation creating a moratorium on freeway construction through July 1, 1962. The National Capital Transportation Agency's 1962 report, Transportation in the National Capital Region, anticipated much of the present Red Line route, with the Red Line following the Baltimore and Ohio Railroad (B&O) right-of-way between Silver Spring and Rockville instead of a direct route between Bethesda and Rockville.

With the formation of the Washington Metropolitan Area Transit Authority (WMATA) in October 1966, planning of the system shifted from federal hands to a regional body with representatives of the District, Maryland, and Virginia. Congressional route approval was no longer a key consideration. Instead, routes had to serve each suburban jurisdiction to assure that they would approve bond referendums to finance the system. Because the least expensive way to build into the suburbs was to use existing railroad right-of-ways, the Red Line took much of its present form, except that it continued to feature a further link between its two stems along the B&O right-of-way. An early proposal from 1967 was more extensive then what was ultimately approved, with the Red Line's western terminus being in Germantown instead of Shady Grove.

By 1969, WMATA had decided on the current routing and stations, except for the extension beyond Rockville to Shady Grove. Montgomery County officials opposed ending the Red Line in downtown Rockville, saying it would cause congestion in the area and use scarce vacant land for a storage yard. Metro proposed extending the Red Line with one more station at Shady Grove. The U.S. Department of Transportation conditionally approved funding for the extension on July 26, 1975.

Construction on the Red Line began with a groundbreaking ceremony at Judiciary Square on December 9, 1969. Construction proved difficult because the National Park Service (NPS) prohibited the construction of a bridge across Rock Creek. NPS required WMATA to build a Red Line tunnel under the creek valley. The tunnel, in turn, caused both the Dupont Circle and Woodley Park stations to be built further underground. WMATA proposed tunneling under Yuma Street from Connecticut Avenue to Wisconsin Avenue, but local residents sued. The litigation delayed construction of the tunnel for two years, and WMATA finally won the right to build the tunnel as proposed.

=== Operation and extension ===
Service on the Red Line (and the Metro as a whole) began on March 27, 1976, with operation between Farragut North and Rhode Island Avenue. Gallery Place's opening was delayed due to a court order regarding lack of accessibility for all, but it opened in the middle of the line on December 15, 1976. The western end of the line was extended one station to Dupont Circle on January 17, 1977, three stations to Van Ness–UDC on December 5, 1981, five stations to Grosvenor–Strathmore on August 25, 1984, and four stations to Shady Grove on December 15, 1984. The eastern end was extended four stations from Rhode Island Avenue-Brentwood to Silver Spring on February 6, 1978—which added Maryland to the system for the first time—two stations to Wheaton on September 22, 1990, and one station to Glenmont on July 25, 1998, completing the line.

The only time the Red Line shared tracks with another line was from January 27, 1997, to September 17, 1999, when the Green Line Commuter Shortcut used Red Line tracks from Brookland–CUA to Farragut North. A short time after the Green Line branch north of Fort Totten opened in the early 1990s, the "Green Line Commuter Shortcut" began as a six-month experiment. Passengers could board the Green Line between Greenbelt and West Hyattsville and travel as far as Farragut North without having to transfer; the trains bypassed Fort Totten via a single-track spur between the West Hyattsville and Brookland–CUA stations. Due to its success, the shortcut continued until the mid-city portion of the Green Line was completed in 1999.

The NoMa–Gallaudet University station (formerly New York Ave–Florida Ave–Gallaudet University), located between Union Station and Rhode Island Avenue–Brentwood, opened on November 20, 2004. It was the system's first infill station (i.e., a new station built between existing stations).

In November 2010, the WMATA authorized $37 million in capital improvements on the Red Line, a part of $212 million of work on the Red Line scheduled for 2010 to 2014.

In April 2012, a 1,200-car parking garage opened at the Glenmont station, joining the existing 1,700-car garage. Construction on the project, funded by the state of Maryland, began in December 2009.

From March 26, 2020, until June 28, 2020, trains were bypassing Grosvenor–Strathmore, Cleveland Park, and Judiciary Square stations due to the COVID-19 pandemic. All stations were reopened beginning on June 28, 2020.

From September 11, 2021, to January 16, 2022, the Rockville and Shady Grove Metro stations were closed due to the Rockville Canopy Replacement Project. On February 25, 2022, WMATA opened a new entrance on the east side of Rockville Pike and a new elevator and staircase to the platforms at the Medical Center station, eliminating the need for thousands of daily riders who emerge from the station on the west side of the Pike to cross the busy six-lane road to reach the Walter Reed National Military Medical Center. In September 2009, Montgomery County applied for a $20 million federal grant, seeking to begin construction in 2011, but the project was not approved until 2013. Construction began in December 2017. The $68 million project, mostly funded by the Department of Defense, also includes new deep elevators, better surface bicycle, and pedestrian facilities, a pedestrian tunnel under Rockville Pike, and an extension of the left-turn lane on southbound MD 355 that opened in late 2021.

On June 1, 2024, stations north of Fort Totten were closed due to repairs and the construction of the new mezzanine at Silver Spring station that will connect to the Purple Line. Takoma was reopened on June 28, while the others reopened on September 1. Automatic train operation, which had ceased systemwide following the 2009 train collision, was allowed to resume on the Red Line in December 2024. In the months that followed, the Washington Metrorail Safety Commission prevented the implementation of ATO on other lines because a small number of automated Red Line trains reportedly overshot the station platforms.

On April 23, 2026, Metro's Board of Directors unanimously approved a $913 million "Red Line Modernization Plan". The plan called for full Red Line automation without human operators, the installation of platform screen doors at 20 of the 27 Red Line stations, and a new signaling system for the line. While similar upgrades were considered for other lines, Metro General Manager Randy Clarke stated that the Red Line was chosen first because of the age of its signaling equipment and its lack of interlining. Metro tentatively projected that the plan may be complete by 2032 or 2033.

== Incidents and accidents ==
=== 2004 Woodley Park accident ===
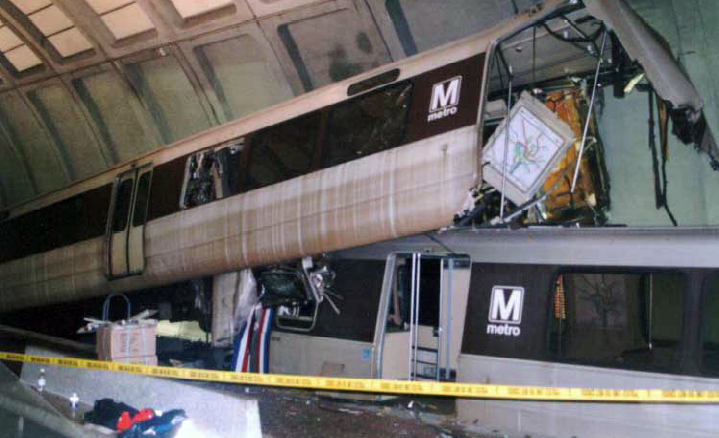
Accident at the Woodley Park station on November 3, 2004

On November 3, 2004, an out-of-service Red Line train rolled backward into the Woodley Park station and hit an in-service train stopped at the platform. Twenty people were injured. A 14-month investigation concluded that the train operator was most likely not alert. Safety officials estimated that at least 79 would have died had the train been full. The train operator was fired and Metro officials agreed to add rollback protection to more than 300 rail cars.

=== 2009 train collision ===
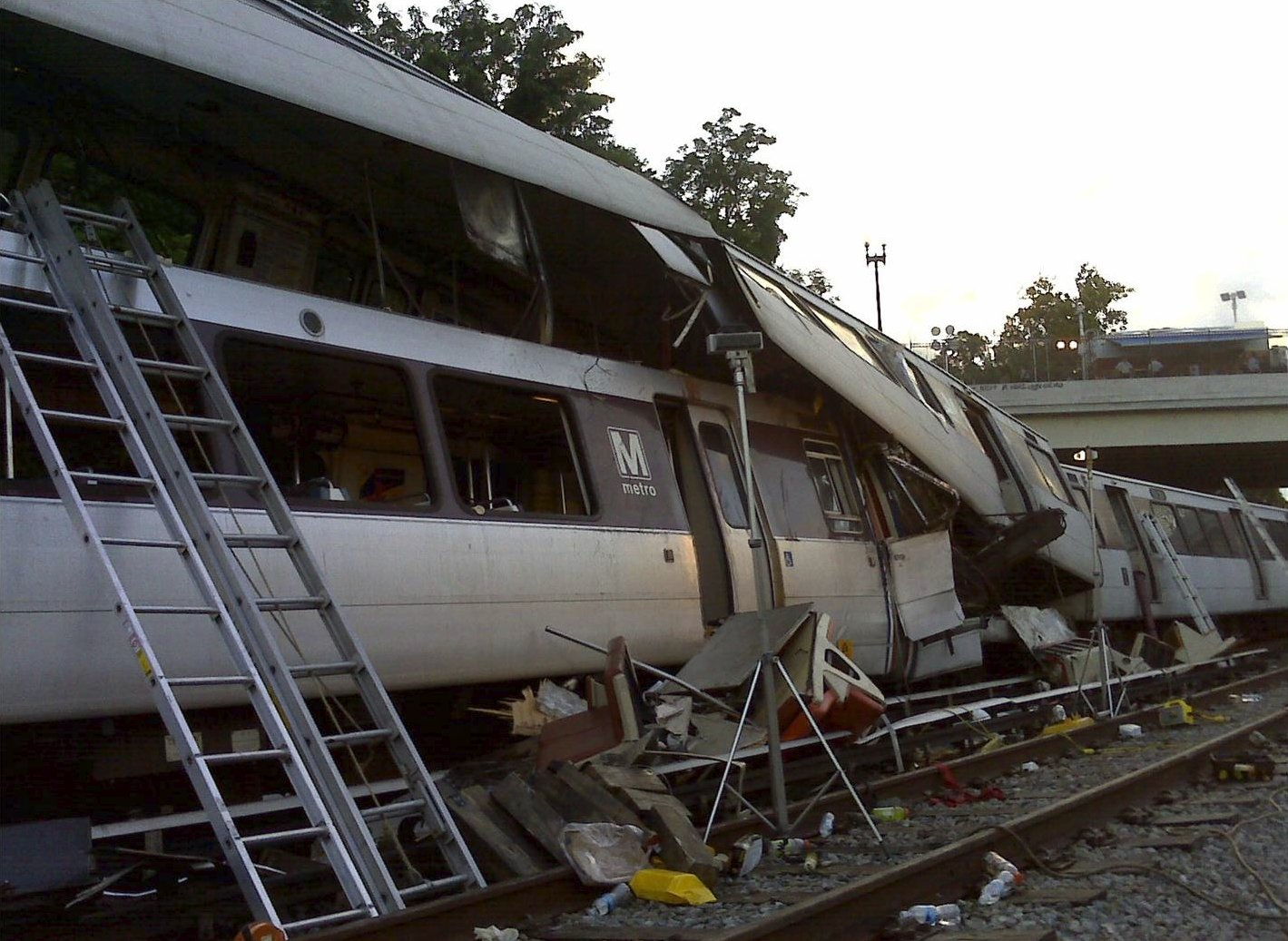
June 2009 Metro collision scene

On June 22, 2009, at 5:03 p.m., a six-car train collided with and telescoped onto a stationary train between the Takoma and Fort Totten Metro stations. Eight passengers and a train operator were killed in the collision and at least 70 people were injured. It is the deadliest accident in the history of the Washington Metro. The National Transportation Safety Board's report of July 27, 2010, blamed the crash on a faulty track circuit, part of the automatic train control system. WMATA issued a list of planned changes.

=== Chronology ===
Dates on which portions of the Red Line opened for service.

Date	Event	Total number of stations	Total line length
March 29, 1976	Line opens between Farragut North and Rhode Island Avenue	5	4.6 mi (7.4 km)
December 15, 1976	Gallery Place opens between existing stations	6	4.6 mi (7.4 km)
January 17, 1977	Extension to Dupont Circle opens	7	1.5 mi (2.4 km)
February 4, 1978	Extension to Silver Spring opens	11	11.4 mi (18.3 km)
December 5, 1981	Extension to Van Ness-UDC opens	14	13.5 mi (21.7 km)
August 25, 1984	Extension to Grosvenor-Strathmore opens	19	20.3 mi (32.7 km)
December 15, 1984	Extension to Shady Grove opens	23	27.3 mi (43.9 km)
September 22, 1990	Extension to Wheaton opens	25	30.5 mi (49.1 km)
July 25, 1998	Extension to Glenmont opens	26	31.9 mi (51.3 km)
November 20, 2004	NoMa–Gallaudet U opens between existing stations	27	31.9 mi (51.3 km)

== Route ==
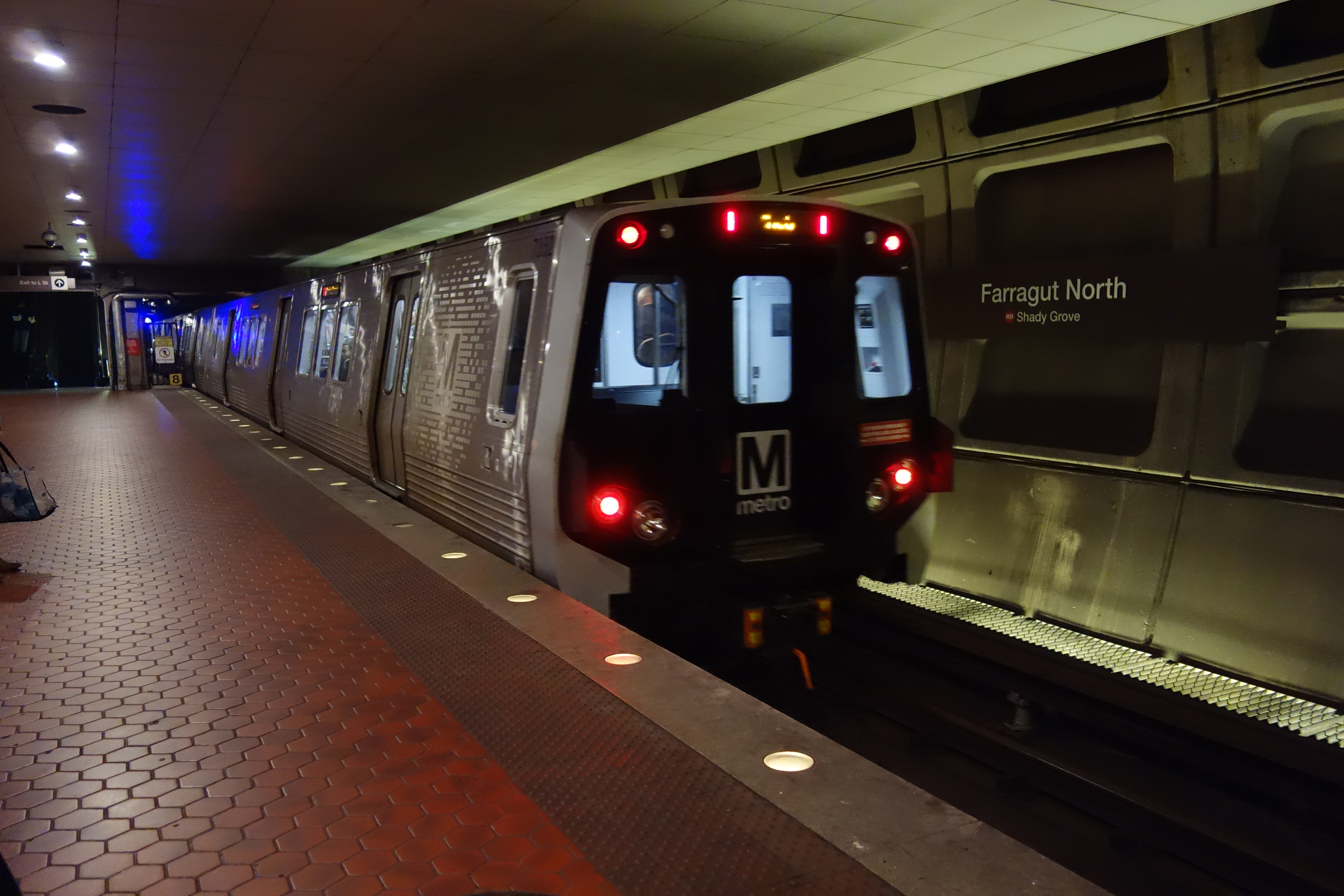
A Shady Grove-bound Red Line train leaving Farragut North in April 2018.

The Red Line begins above ground at Shady Grove, and parallels CSX Transportation's Metropolitan Subdivision (served by MARC Brunswick Line trains) to south of Twinbrook. The route then enters a tunnel and curves west to run under Rockville Pike at North Bethesda. Until Tenleytown, the line follows the route of Rockville Pike and Wisconsin Avenue in a tunnel, except for a bridge over the Capital Beltway (I-495). The tunnel curves east at Tenleytown into Yuma Street to reach the Van Ness–UDC station, curving south there to travel under Connecticut Avenue through south of Farragut Square. A curve under Lafayette Park takes the tunnel east under G Street Northwest through the Metro Center and Gallery Place stations.

From Gallery Place through Judiciary Square, the line runs southeast, turning east again at D Street to reach Union Station. There it turns north and surfaces next to Union Station's platforms, follows the Washington Terminal yard tracks north to Brentwood where the line turns northwestward and again joins CSX Transportation's Metropolitan Subdivision tracks, running in a unique gauntlet track arrangement, with the freight railroad tracks straddling the Metro tracks. The Red Line continues in this manner northwest across the DC-Maryland line, through Takoma and past Silver Spring. It reenters a tunnel at 16th Street and heads north under Georgia Avenue to the end at Glenmont.

The Metropolitan Subdivision right-of-way was part of the former B&O route to downtown Washington, D.C. The MARC commuter rail system uses this parallel route with stops in Silver Spring and Rockville when traveling between Washington and Martinsburg, West Virginia, while Amtrak uses this parallel route with a stop in Rockville when traveling the Floridian route between Miami and Chicago.

There is a maintenance yard between the NoMa–Gallaudet and Rhode Island Avenue–Brentwood stops along with facilities just outside Shady Grove and Glenmont stops as well.

Internally, WMATA calls the Red Line the Shady Grove Route (A) and the Glenmont Route (B), which meet at Metro Center.

The Red Line needs 44 trains (10 eight-car trains and 34 six-car trains, consisting of 284 rail cars) to run at peak capacity.

The Red Line is one of two lines that do not enter Virginia, the other being the Green Line.

== Stations ==
The line serves the following stations, from northwest to northeast:

Station	Code	Location	Opened	Image	Rail connections	Bus Connections	Notes
Shady Grove	A15	Montgomery County, MD	December 15, 1984		N/A	Ride On: 43, 53, 55, 57, 58, 59, 60, 61, 63, 64, 65, 66, 67, 71, 73, 74, 76, 78, 79, 90, 100, Extra 101, Extra Pink, Extra Lime	Northwestern terminus
Rockville	A14	Montgomery County, MD	December 15, 1984		Amtrak: Floridian; MARC: ■ Brunswick Line	Metrobus: M82; Ride On: 40, 44, 45, 46, 47, 48, 49, 52, 54, 55, 56, 59, 63, 81, 301, Extra 101	N/A
Twinbrook	A13	Montgomery County, MD	December 15, 1984		N/A	Metrobus: M12; Ride On: 5, 26, 44, 45, 46	N/A
North Bethesda (Note: Originally opened as White Flint. Changed in 2022)	A12	Montgomery County, MD	December 15, 1984		N/A	Metrobus: M42, M44; Ride On: 5, 26, 38, 42, 46, 81, Extra 101	N/A
Grosvenor–Strathmore	A11	Montgomery County, MD	August 25, 1984		N/A	Ride-On: 6, 37, 46, 96, Extra 101	N/A
Medical Center	A10	Montgomery County, MD	August 25, 1984		N/A	Metrobus: M70; Ride On: 30, 33, 34, 46, 70, Extra 101; Fairfax Connector: 798	N/A
Bethesda	A09	Montgomery County, MD	August 25, 1984		MTA: Purple Line (planned)	Metrobus: D96, M22, M70; Ride On: 29, 30, 32, 34, 36, 47, 70; Fairfax Connector: 798	N/A
Friendship Heights	A08	Washington D.C.	August 25, 1984		N/A	Metrobus: C83, D80, D82, D96, M82; Ride On: 1, 11, 23, 29	N/A
Tenleytown–AU	A07	Washington D.C.	August 25, 1984		N/A	Metrobus: C51, C61, C81, C85, C87, D80, D82, D90	N/A
Van Ness–UDC	A06	Washington D.C.	December 5, 1981		N/A	Metrobus: C87, D70, D72	N/A
Cleveland Park	A05	Washington D.C.	December 5, 1981		N/A	Metrobus: C61, C87, D70, D72	N/A
Woodley Park	A04	Washington D.C.	December 5, 1981		N/A	Metrobus: C51, C53, D70	Second deepest station in the Metrorail network.
Dupont Circle	A03	Washington D.C.	January 17, 1977		N/A	Metrobus: C91, D74, D90, D94, D96	N/A
Farragut North	A02	Washington D.C.	March 27, 1976		N/A	Metrobus: A49, A58, D10, D20, D70, D72, D80, D94, F19	Out-of-station interchange at Farragut West
Metro Center	A01	Washington D.C.	March 27, 1976		Orange Line (Washington Metro) Silver Line (Washington Metro) Blue Line (Washington Metro)	Metrobus: A29, A49, D10, D20, D24, D30, D32, D34, D36, D44, D5X, D60, D6X, D94	N/A
Gallery Place	B01	Washington D.C.	December 15, 1976		Yellow Line (Washington Metro) Green Line (Washington Metro)	Metrobus: D20, D24, D2X, D30, D34, D40, D4X, D80, D94	N/A
Judiciary Square	B02	Washington D.C.	March 27, 1976		N/A	Metrobus: D20, D24, D30	N/A
Union Station	B03	Washington D.C.	March 27, 1976		Amtrak: Acela, Cardinal, Carolinian, Crescent, Floridian, Northeast Regional, Palmetto, Silver Meteor, Vermonter; MARC: ■ Brunswick Line, ■ Camden Line, ■ Penn Line; VRE: ■ Fredericksburg Line, ■ Manassas Line	Metrobus: C43, C51, C55, C71, D20, D24, D2X, D30, D80	N/A
NoMa–Gallaudet U	B35	Washington D.C.	November 20, 2004		N/A	Metrobus: C53, C57	Infill station, built in 2004. The first infill station on the Metrorail network.
Rhode Island Avenue	B04	Washington D.C.	March 27, 1976		N/A	Metrobus: D32, D36, D74, P10, P1X, P40	N/A
Brookland–CUA	B05	Washington D.C.	February 6, 1978		N/A	Metrobus: C61, C63, D30, D34, D74, P33	N/A
Fort Totten	B06	Washington D.C.	February 6, 1978		Yellow Line (Washington Metro) Green Line (Washington Metro)	Metrobus: C71, C77, C81, D30, D44, M60, M6X, P15, P16, P32, P35	N/A
Takoma	B07	Washington D.C.	February 6, 1978		N/A	Metrobus: C75, C77, D50, D5X, P42; Ride On: 12, 13, 14, 16, 18, 24, 25	N/A
Silver Spring	B08	Montgomery County, MD	February 6, 1978		MTA: Purple Line (planned); MARC: ■ Brunswick Line	Metrobus: C87, D40, D4X, D60, D6X, M20, M52, M54, M70, P30; Ride On: 1, 2, 4, 5, 8, 9, 11, 12, 13, 14, 15, 16, 17, 18, 19, 20, 21, 22, 28, FLASH Blue, FLASH Orange	N/A
Forest Glen	B09	Montgomery County, MD	September 22, 1990		N/A	Metrobus: M20; Ride On: 7, 8	Deepest station in the Metrorail network. The only station without escalators.
Wheaton	B10	Montgomery County, MD	September 22, 1990		N/A	Metrobus: M12, M20, M22; Ride On: 4, 7, 8, 9, 31, 34, 37, 38, 40, 41, 48	This station has the longest escalators in the western hemisphere.
Glenmont	B11	Montgomery County, MD	July 25, 1998		N/A	Metrobus: M20, M22, M42, M44; Ride On: 26, 31, 33, 39, 41, 49, 51, 53	Northeastern terminus

== Additions, renovations and repairs ==
In May 2026 WMATA announced that the Bethesda, Medical Center and Grosvenor–Strathmore stations will be closed July 6 to September 6, 2026, to allow for completion of a new mezzanine in Bethesda, which will connect to the future Purple Line light rail station; and for completion of other Red Line construction projects.

== Proposed improvements ==
In 2011, the WMATA examined the possibility of extending the Red Line past the Shady Grove station to the Metropolitan Grove station by 2040.

In 2021, an infill station between Takoma and Silver Spring called North Takoma station that used to be part of the Metropolitan Subdivision was proposed.
