= North Bethesda station =

Washington Metro station

North Bethesda
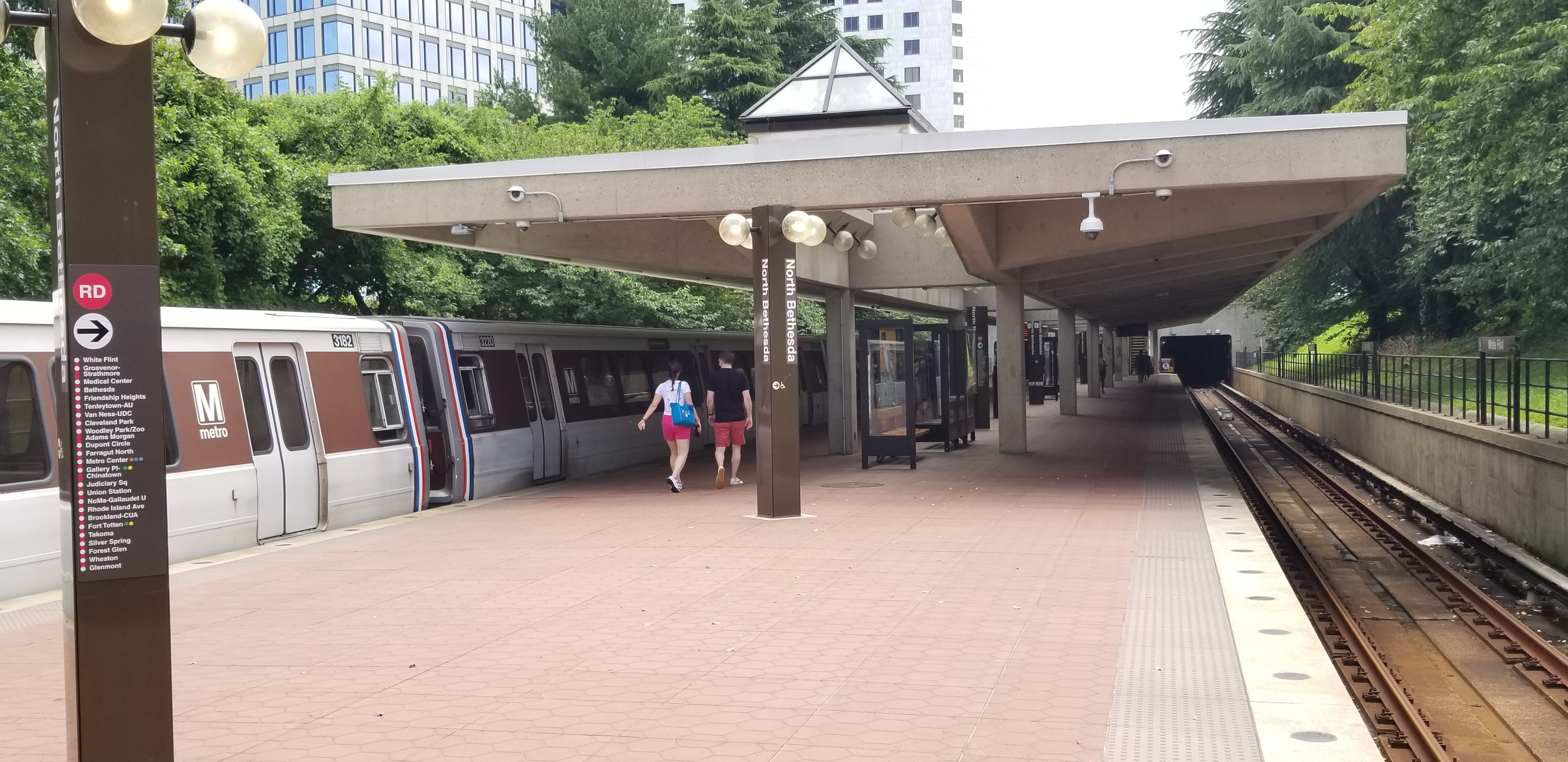
- North Bethesda station platform in July 2022

General information
- Location: North Bethesda, Maryland, U.S.
- Coordinates: 39.048043°N 77.113131°W
- Owner: Washington Metropolitan Area Transit Authority
- Platforms: 1 island platform
- Tracks: 2
- Connections: Metrobus: M42, M44; Ride On: 5, 26, 38, 42, 46, 81, 101; NIH Bethesda Shuttles: Fishers Lane route

Construction
- Structure type: Below-grade
- Parking: 982 spaces
- Cycle facilities: Capital Bikeshare, 32 racks and 20 lockers
- Accessible: yes

Other information
- Station code: A12

History
- Opened: December 15, 1984; 41 years ago
- Former names: Nicholson Lane (during planning); White Flint (1984–2022)

Passengers
- 2025: 2,525 (average weekday)
- Rank: 69 of 98

Services
Preceding station	Washington Metro	Following station
Twinbrook toward Shady Grove	Red Line	Grosvenor–Strathmore toward Glenmont
Route map
Location

North Bethesda station is a rapid transit station on the Red Line of the Washington Metro in North Bethesda, Maryland. The North Bethesda station was opened on December 15, 1984, as White Flint and is operated by the Washington Metropolitan Area Transit Authority (WMATA). Providing service for the Red Line, the station serves residential and commercial areas of North Bethesda and Rockville and is located near the former White Flint Mall and the new Pike & Rose mixed-use development.

== Location ==
North Bethesda station serves commercial and residential areas of North Bethesda and Rockville. The station entrance is located immediately adjacent to the headquarters of the Nuclear Regulatory Commission. The large Pike & Rose mixed-use development sits one block north of the station. The former site of its original "White Flint" namesake, White Flint Mall, is located about 4/10-mile (0.64 km) southeast of the station and was shuttered in 2015.

=== Transit-oriented development ===
North Bethesda station is at the center of the Pike District (formerly White Flint) planning area which was the subject of two sector plans (in 2010 and 2018) that were intended to generate dense, transit-oriented development. The sector plans prescribed new zoning to allow taller buildings to be built closer to the Metro station along with a new street grid to link disjointed areas.

== History ==
The station opened on December 15, 1984 as part of a 7-mile (11 km), four-station northwestern extension of the Red Line between Grosvenor–Strathmore and Shady Grove stations. White Flint was originally known as Nicholson Lane in planning documents, but the station was renamed after the White Flint Mall before it opened. A pylon at Farragut North still bears the original name of the station; extensions were originally printed on pylons throughout the system and covered up until they opened.

On December 9, 2021, the Metro board voted to change the name of the station from White Flint to North Bethesda. The new name was added to Metro system maps when the second phase of the Silver Line opened on November 15, 2022. In June 2022, signage in the station began to be modified to reflect the name change. The new name change became official on September 11, 2022.

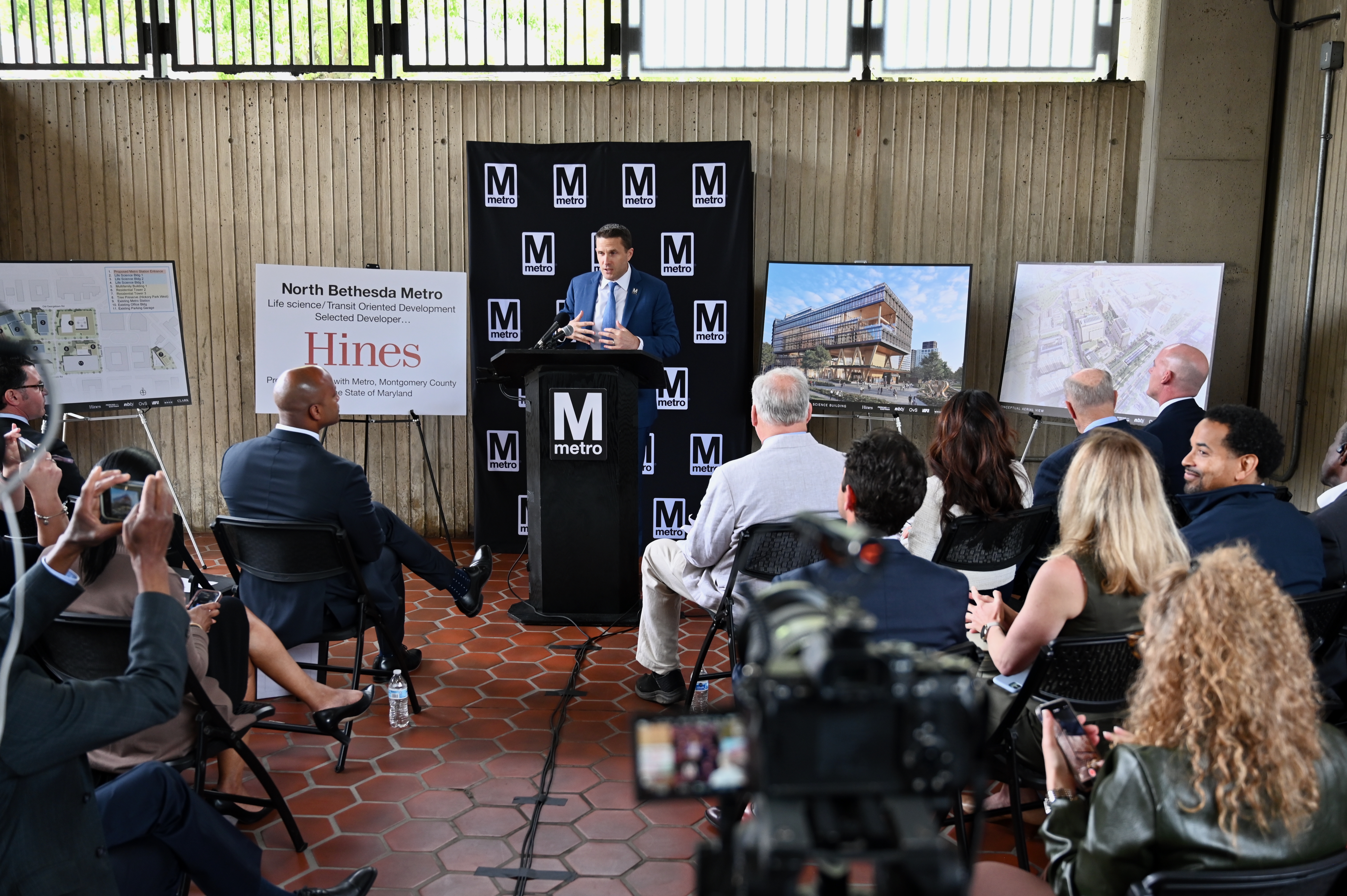
Randy Clarke speaks at an event announcing a partner for development north of the station in 2025.

On July 29, 2024, Metro and Montgomery County announced they would seek to develop the land north of the station with new mixed-use buildings and a life sciences research campus for the University of Maryland Institute for Health Computing. On May 27, 2025, Metro announced that Hines had been selected to develop the land north of the station and to construct an additional entrance.

== Station layout ==
North Bethesda station has an island platform located just below street level in an open cut, which leads to a tunnel on either side of the station. Access to the station is provided at ground level at the northeast corner of Rockville Pike and Marinelli Road, with a Metro-style underpass providing access to the northwest corner of the intersection. A parking garage is located east of the station on Marinelli Road. The station features escalators with the elevator between them as seen at Addison Road and Union Station between the mezzanine and platform.

== Notable places nearby ==
- Pike & Rose
- Nuclear Regulatory Commission
- Kennedy Shriver Aquatic Center
- Westfield Montgomery Mall is accessible via Ride On 26 or 42 bus
