= Ramey =

Ramey may refer to:

- Ramey Air Force Base, a former base in Aguadilla, Puerto Rico
- Ramey, Pennsylvania
- Ramey, Puerto Rico, a US sub-orbital launch site
- Ramey House, an historic mansion in Tyler, Texas, USA

== People ==
=== Given name ===
- Ramey Dawoud (born 1991), Sudanese American Rapper, actor
- Ramey Whitney (1908–1988), American politician from Nebraska

=== Surname ===
- Claude Ramey (1754–1838), French sculptor, father of Etienne-Jules Ramey
- Estelle Ramey (1917–2006) American scientist
- Étienne-Jules Ramey (1796–1852), French sculptor
- Harry R. Ramey, Jr., US politician
- Horace Ramey (1885–1974), American athlete
- Howard Knox Ramey (1896–1943), American general
- India Ramey (born 1974), American singer-songwriter
- James Ramey (1944–1970): see Baby Huey (singer)
- James Ramey (1917-2015), American politician
- James T. Ramey (1914–2010), American lawyer
- Jim Ramey (born 1957), American football player
- Nancy Ramey (1940–2022), American competition swimmer
- Phillip Ramey (born 1939), American composer
- Samuel Ramey (born 1942), American singer
- Valerie Ramey, American economist
- Venus Ramey (1924–2017), Miss America, 1944
- Roger M. Ramey, American general of the Eighth Air Force who was involved with the Roswell UFO incident
