= James Ramey =

James Ramey may refer to:

- Baby Huey (singer) (James Thomas Ramey, 1944–1970), American rock and soul singer
- James Ramey (politician) (1917–2015), American politician in South Dakota
- James T. Ramey (1914–2010), American lawyer and nuclear expert
