= Maryland Route 191 =

State highway in Montgomery County, Maryland, U.S.

Maryland Route 191
- Maryland Route 191 highlighted in red

Route information
- Maintained by MDSHA
- Length: 7.16 mi (11.52 km)
- Existed: 1927–present

Major junctions
- West end: MD 190 in Potomac
- MD 188 in Bethesda; MD 614 in Bethesda; MD 355 in Bethesda
- East end: MD 185 in Chevy Chase

Location
- Country: United States
- State: Maryland
- Counties: Montgomery

Highway system
- Maryland highway system; Interstate; US; State; Scenic Byways
← MD 190	→ MD 192

Maryland Route 191 (MD 191) is a state highway in southwestern Montgomery County in the U.S. state of Maryland.

Known for most of its length as Bradley Boulevard, the highway runs 7.16 miles (11.52 km) from MD 190 (River Road) in Potomac east through Bethesda to MD 185 (Connecticut Avenue) in Chevy Chase. Its S-shaped path serves an affluent area with many golf courses.

== Route description ==
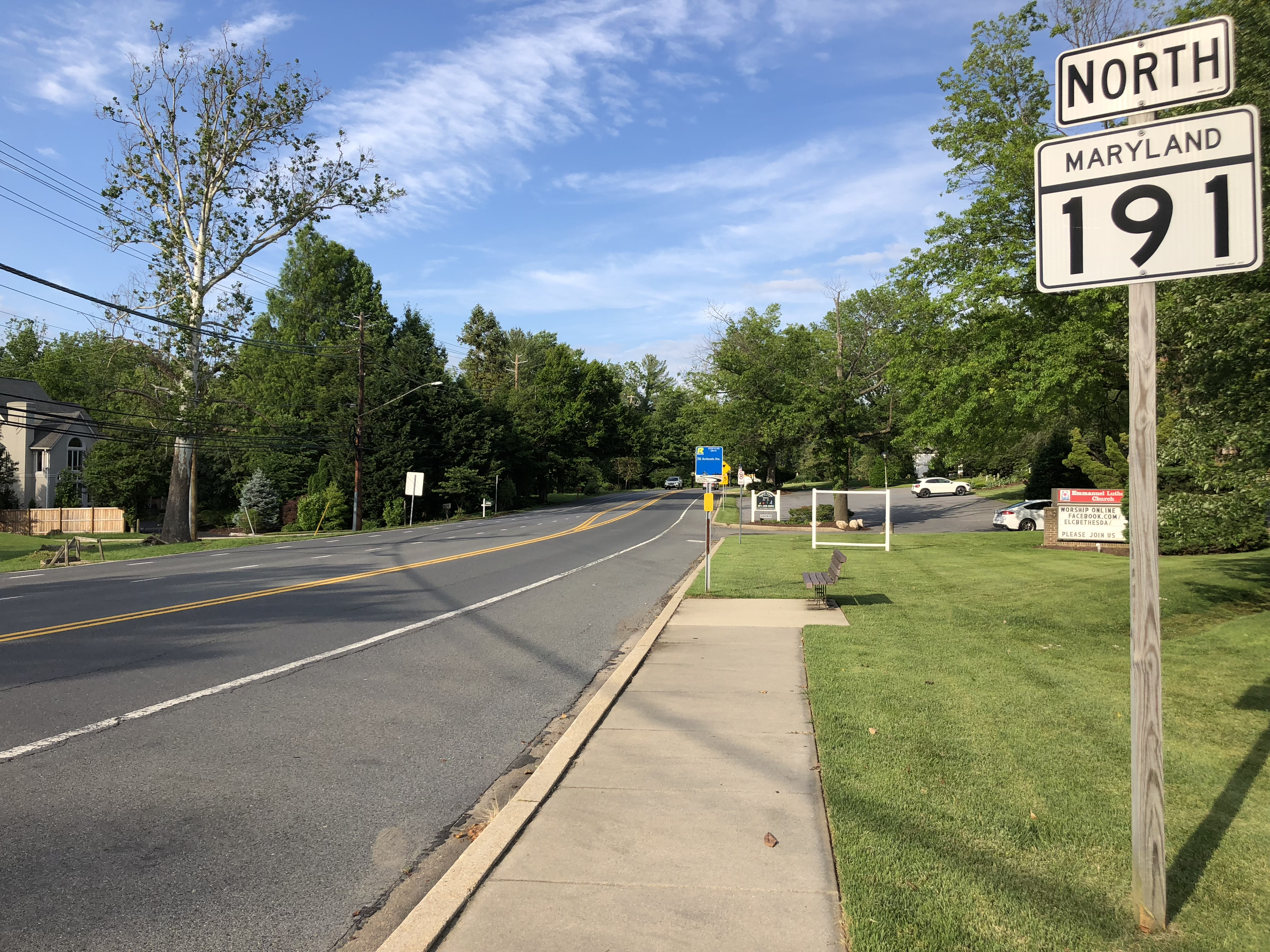
View north along MD 191 at Seven Locks Road in Potomac

MD 191 begins at an intersection with MD 190 (River Road) southeast of the center of Potomac. Bradley Boulevard continues west as a county highway along the edge of Congressional Country Club to its end at Persimmon Tree Road, which connects Potomac with Cabin John. The named road's terminus is near another golf course, the TPC Potomac at Avenel Farm. MD 191 heads northeast as a two-lane undivided road along the edge of another part of Congressional Country Club and crosses Cabin John Creek before the route intersects Seven Locks Road. The highway continues east past Bethesda Country Club and temporarily expands to a wide two-lane divided highway around its overpass of I-495 (Capital Beltway). MD 191 passes to the north of Burning Tree Club, then curves southeast through the western parts of Bethesda. At Huntington Parkway, which leads east to MD 187 (Old Georgetown Road), the state highway veers south and intersects MD 188 (Wilson Lane).

MD 191 veers east and expands to a six-lane divided highway at its intersection with MD 614 (Goldsboro Road). The highway intersects Arlington Road, then passes under the Capital Crescent Trail; two of the routes's six lanes become parking lanes east of the trail underpass. MD 191's divided highway section ends at its intersection with MD 355 (Wisconsin Avenue) at the southern end of downtown Bethesda. The state highway continues east as Bradley Lane, a narrow two-lane undivided street that passes between Chevy Chase Country Club to the south and the town of Chevy Chase to the north. MD 191 reaches its eastern terminus at MD 185 (Connecticut Avenue) at the eastern end of the country club and the town. (Note: Bradley Lane continues east from Connecticut Avenue as a street that separates the town of Chevy Chase Village to the south from the village of Chevy Chase Section Three to the north. The street continues to MD 186 (Brookville Road), then after a jog on that state highway continues two blocks to a dead end in the village of Martin's Additions.))

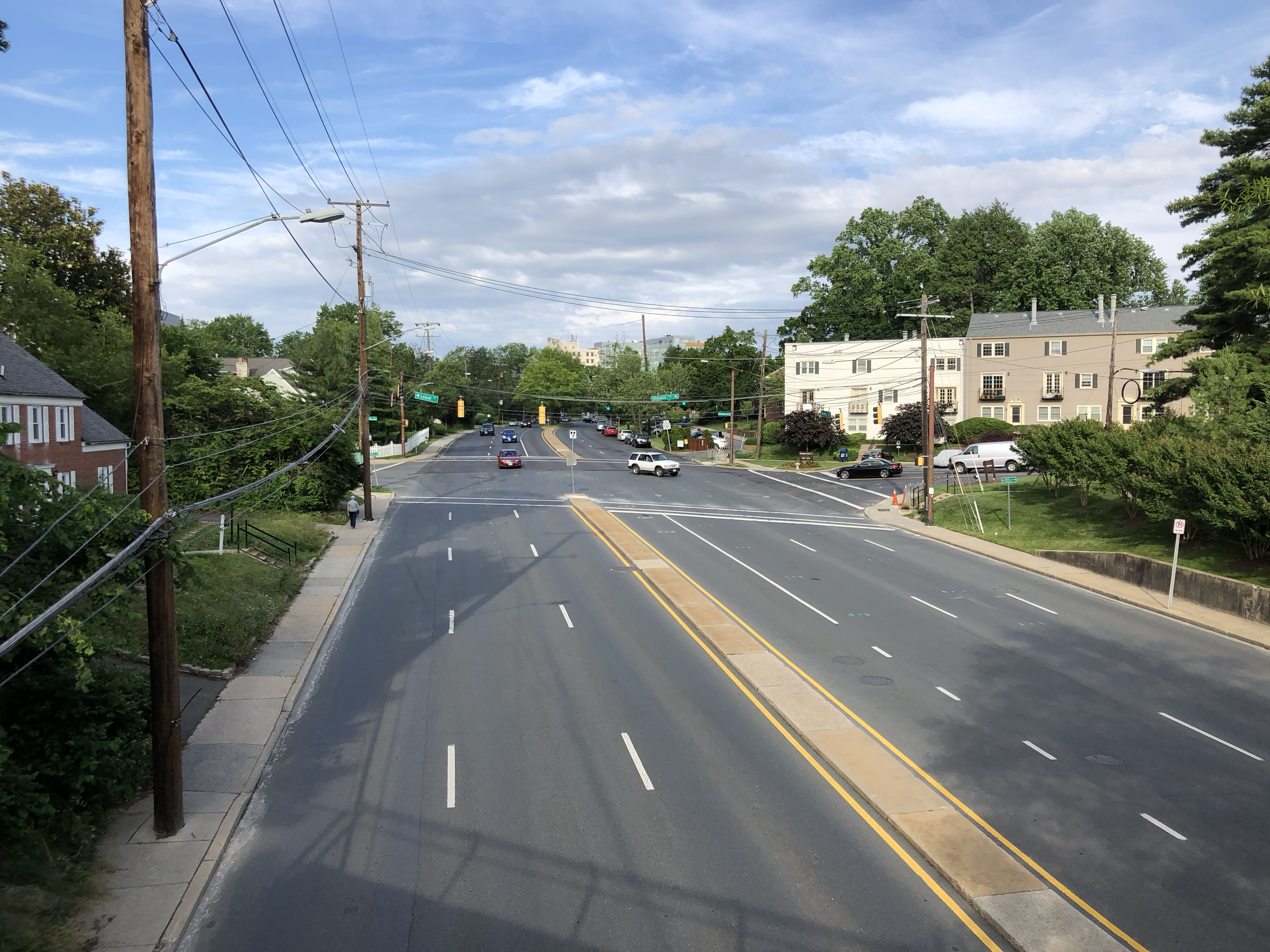
View east along MD 191 from the Capital Crescent Trail in Bethesda

== History ==
Bradley Lane, the name for the Chevy Chase portion of MD 191, was paved as a macadam road from Wisconsin Avenue east to MD 186 (Brookville Road) by 1910. The segment of Bradley Lane from Connecticut Avenue (then designated MD 193, now MD 185) east to Brookville Road would be removed from the state highway system, apparently in the 1940s. It appears on state highway maps in 1939 but not in 1946, though it is labelled a state highway on federal maps of the 1960s.

The remainder of the original extent of MD 191 was constructed along mostly new alignment between 1921 and 1923. The highway was built as a macadam road along existing Persimmon Tree Road from MacArthur Boulevard in Cabin John north to Potomac and east along Bradley Boulevard to River Road. MD 191 was constructed as a concrete road along a new alignment from River Road to Seven Locks Road. The highway was surfaced with macadam along an existing road from Seven Locks Road to what is today Huntington Parkway, then along new alignment south and east to the intersection of Wisconsin Avenue and Bradley Lane.

By 1945, MD 191 was expanded to a divided highway for the four-tenths of a mile from Wisconsin Avenue (then designated U.S. Route 240, now MD 355) westward to the Baltimore and Ohio Railroad crossing (now the Capital Crescent Trail). By 1951, a bridge had been built to carry the railroad over the highway. By 1962, the divided highway had been extended another half-mile westward to near MD 614 (Goldsboro Road).

1962 also saw changes to accommodate the under-construction Capital Beltway. MD 191 and Eggert Drive were moved at the site of the Persimmon Tree Road bridge and a cut-off county road was built to form a four-way intersection just north of a bridge built to carry MD 191 across the Beltway. The state highway continued to follow the old alignment of Persimmon Tree Road (now Persimmon Tree Lane) instead of the cut-off until 1999.

In 1999, the Cabin John–Potomac portion of MD 191 was removed from the state highway system. The highway along Persimmon Tree Road and the portion of Bradley Boulevard west of MD 190 were transferred to Montgomery County maintenance in a highway swap to designate Great Seneca Highway as MD 119.

== Junction list ==
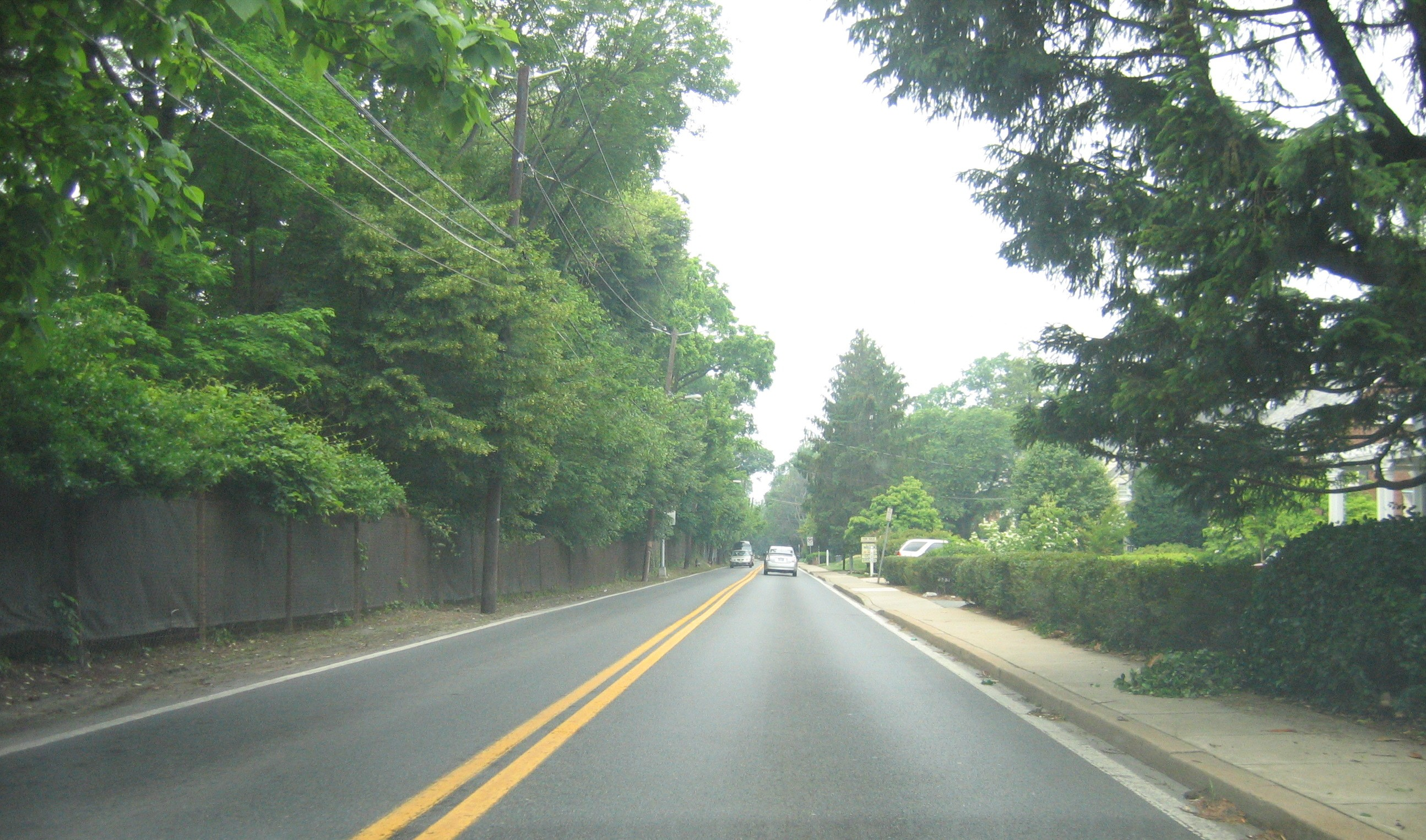
MD 191 between MD 355 and MD 185 in Chevy Chase

The entire route is in Montgomery County.

Location	mi	km	Destinations	Notes
Potomac	0.00	0.00	MD 190 (River Road) / Bradley Boulevard west – Bethesda	Western terminus
Bethesda	4.71	7.58	MD 188 (Wilson Lane) – Glen Echo	
Bethesda	5.53	8.90	MD 614 south (Goldsboro Road) – Glen Echo	Northern terminus of MD 614
Bethesda	6.43	10.35	MD 355 (Wisconsin Avenue) – Rockville, Washington	
Chevy Chase	7.16	11.52	MD 185 (Connecticut Avenue) / Bradley Lane east – Kensington, Washington	Eastern terminus
1.000 mi = 1.609 km; 1.000 km = 0.621 mi
