= Maryland Route 355 =

State highway in Montgomery and Frederick Counties, Maryland, United States

Maryland Route 355

Route information
- Maintained by MDSHA
- Length: 36.75 mi (59.14 km)
- Existed: 1954–present
- Tourist routes: Antietam Campaign Scenic Byway

Major junctions
- South end: Wisconsin Avenue NW at Washington, D.C. border in Bethesda
- I-495 / I-270 in Bethesda; MD 28 in Rockville; I-370 in Gaithersburg; MD 27 in Germantown; MD 121 in Clarksburg; MD 109 in Hyattstown; MD 75 near Hyattstown; MD 80 in Urbana; MD 85 in Frederick
- North end: Market Street in Frederick

Location
- Country: United States
- State: Maryland
- Counties: Montgomery, Frederick

Highway system
- Maryland highway system; Interstate; US; State; Scenic Byways
← MD 354	→ MD 358

Maryland Route 355 (MD 355) is a 36.75-mile (59.14 km) north–south road in western central Maryland in the United States. The southern terminus of the route is in Bethesda in Montgomery County, where Wisconsin Avenue meets the county's border with Washington, D.C. The northern terminus is just north of a bridge over Interstate 70 (I-70)/U.S. Route 40 (US 40) in the city of Frederick in Frederick County, where the road continues north as Market Street through Frederick toward MD 26.

MD 355 serves as a major thoroughfare through Frederick and Montgomery counties, passing through Bethesda, Rockville, Gaithersburg, Germantown, Clarksburg, Hyattstown, Urbana, and Frederick, roughly parallel to I-270. The southern portion of the route from the Washington, D.C., border to Germantown is a suburban four- to six-lane divided highway lined with many businesses. North of Germantown, the route is predominantly a two-lane rural road until it reaches Frederick, where it passes through commercial areas in the southern part of the city. The road changes names along its route: from south to north, it is called Wisconsin Avenue, Rockville Pike, Hungerford Drive, Frederick Road, and Urbana Pike.

MD 355 is the original route of US 240, which was planned in 1926 to run from Washington, D.C., north to Harrisburg, Pennsylvania; instead, the route was designated a part of US 15 north of Frederick. This route served as the primary connector linking Frederick and points west to Washington, D.C. During the 1950s, US 240 was moved in stages to the Washington National Pike, a freeway between Bethesda and Frederick shared with I-70S (now I-270). MD 355 was designated onto the former alignment of US 240 between Bethesda and Frederick as each stage of freeway was built. MD 355 was also designated through Frederick along Market Street, which was the former alignment of US 15 through the city before it was moved to a bypass in 1959. US 240 was decommissioned in 1972, and MD 355 was extended south along the former US 240 to the Washington, D.C. border. In 2006, the interchange with US 15 at the route's northern terminus was removed, resulting in MD 355 ending just short of US 15 at a dead end. By 2009, a four-lane divided bypass of Urbana for MD 355, funded by private developers, was completed. The former alignment of MD 355 through Urbana was designated as MD 355 Business (MD 355 Bus.) before being removed from the state highway system. The same year, the portion of MD 355 north of I-70 was transferred to the city of Frederick and is no longer considered part of the route.

== Route description ==
MD 355 is a part of the main National Highway System from the District of Columbia line to I-495, in Bethesda. The highway is also a part of the National Highway System as an intermodal connector from I-495 to Shady Grove Road in Rockville, and as a principal arterial from Shady Grove Road to MD 27 in Germantown.

=== Montgomery County ===
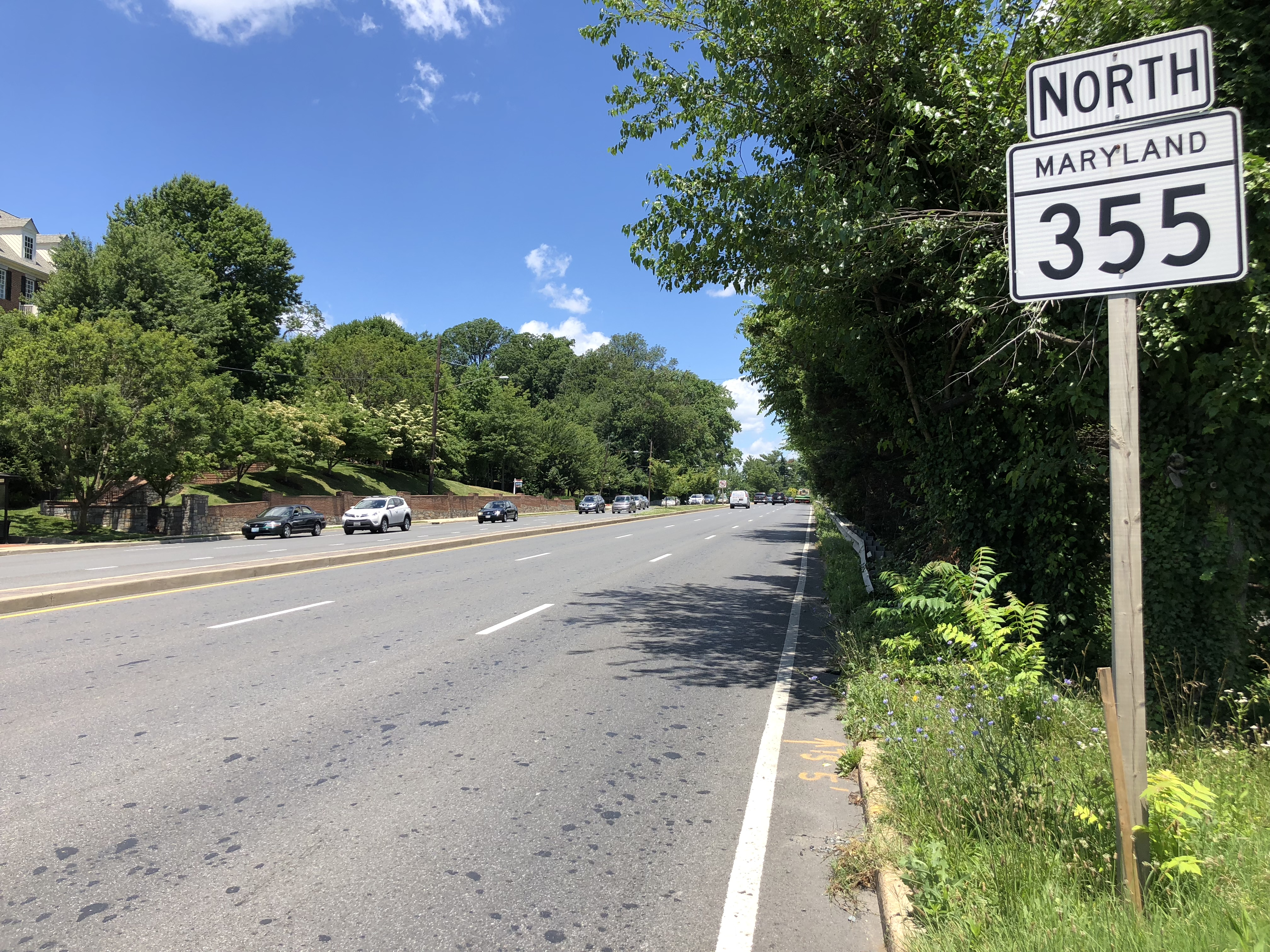
MD 355 northbound past Cedar Lane in Bethesda

MD 355 begins in the Bethesda CDP, at the intersection with Western Avenue NW / Western Avenue (Maryland), the northwestern border between Washington, D.C., and the state of Maryland.

The road is the northern extension of Wisconsin Avenue NW, which begins in Georgetown at an intersection with K Street NW underneath US 29 (Whitehurst Freeway NW), just north of the Potomac River.

From the D.C. border, MD 355 heads north as Wisconsin Avenue, a six-lane divided highway. Washington Metro's Red Line runs in a tunnel underneath the road.

It runs past retail and high-rise buildings in Friendship Heights and the Village of Friendship Heights, including The Shops at Wisconsin Place and the Friendship Heights station along the Red Line. North of Friendship Heights, the route continues into the wooded residential area of Somerset, before passing the Chevy Chase Country Club on the east side of the road, and the residential areas of the town of Chevy Chase, and its associated villages, to the west. It then forms an intersection with MD 191 (Bradley Boulevard) and Bradley Lane.

Past this intersection, MD 355 enters downtown Bethesda, where it heads back into commercial areas with high-rise buildings. The road intersects MD 410 (Montgomery Avenue) one-way eastbound, the westbound direction of MD 410 (East West Highway), and MD 187 (Old Georgetown Road), a short distance north, near the Red Line's Bethesda station. The road continues through the community, passing Bethesda Theatre, a 1938 Art Deco cinema. It leaves the downtown area of Bethesda and becomes Rockville Pike at the intersection with Glenbrook Parkway / Woodmont Avenue. From here, the road passes west of Naval Support Activity Bethesda, which is home to the Walter Reed National Military Medical Center, one of the United States' most prominent military hospitals, and east of the National Institutes of Health, which is home to the United States National Library of Medicine, the world's largest medical library. The Medical Center station along the Red Line is located in this area.

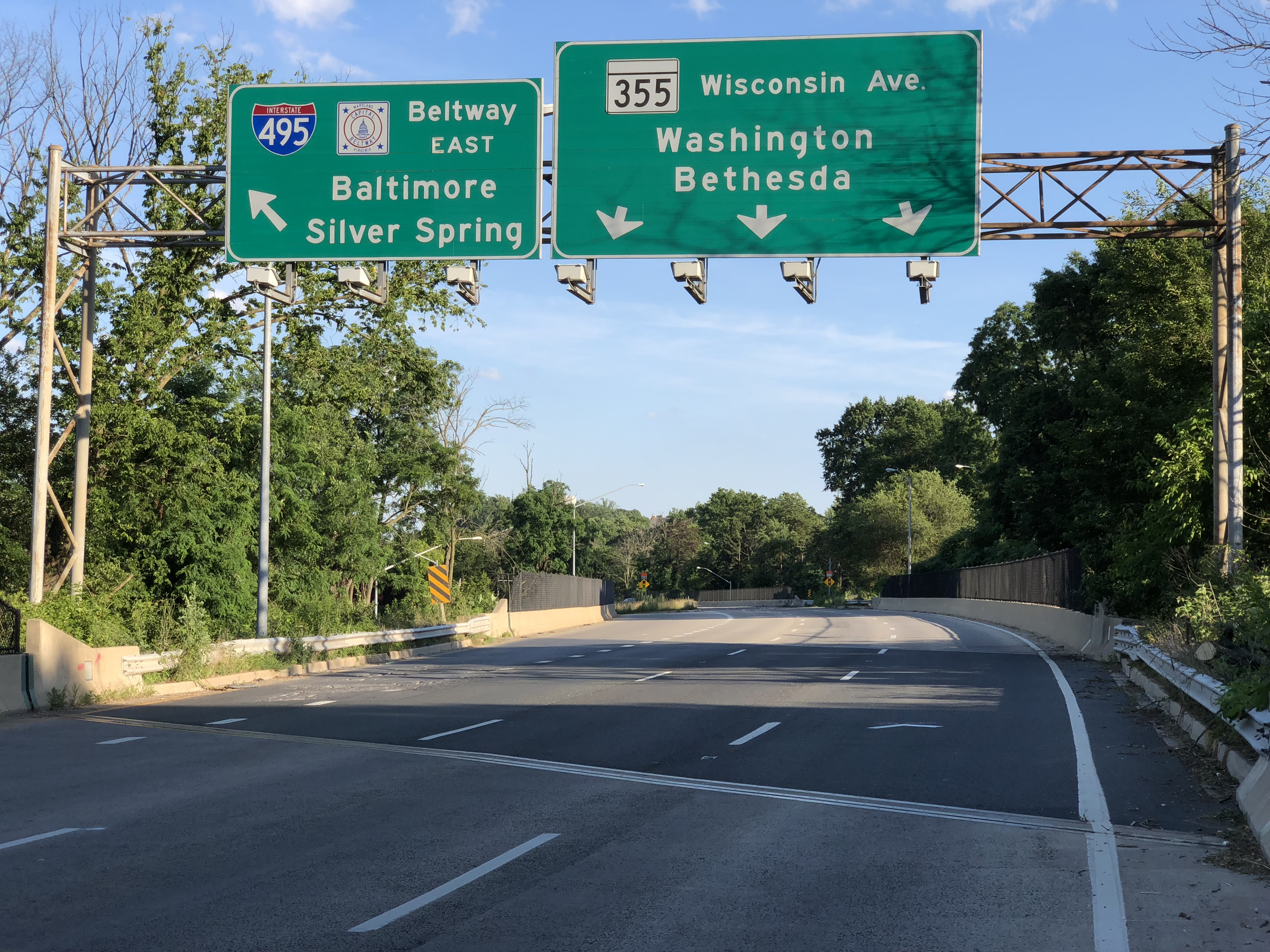
MD 355 southbound at I-495 in Bethesda

The road then passes west of Stone Ridge School of the Sacred Heart, intersects Cedar Lane, and heads north into wooded areas, passing near residences as well as the Bethesda Meeting House, an 1850 wood-frame church. MD 355 continues north through more suburban residential areas before coming to an interchange that provides access to I-495 (Capital Beltway) and the southern terminus of I-270, where the Metro Red Line comes above the surface in the median of the route and passes over I-495. Past this interchange, the road skirts the edge of Rock Creek Park, coming to an intersection with Grosvenor Lane that features a northbound jughandle. The route passes to the west of the Linden Oak at the Grosvenor Lane intersection. MD 355 continues into residential areas of North Bethesda, where the Red Line parallels the route to the east to the Grosvenor–Strathmore station before returning to running under the road. Farther north, the route comes to the intersection with MD 547 (Strathmore Avenue) east of Georgetown Preparatory School.

The route heads through some residential neighborhoods before entering a commercial area with strip malls and some high-rise buildings where White Flint Mall, once one of the D.C. metropolitan area's largest shopping malls, was located on the east side of the road. MD 355 passes to the west of the Nuclear Regulatory Commission headquarters and heads past the North Bethesda station along the Red Line. The road comes to an intersection with Old Georgetown Road as well as a grade-separated interchange at Montrose Parkway. The Metro Red Line tunnel draws farther east from MD 355 before it crosses into Rockville, the county seat of Montgomery County. In Rockville, the road passes more commercial development with the Metro Red Line and CSX's Metropolitan Subdivision railroad line paralleling the road a short distance to the east. The route intersects MD 911 (First Street) and Wootton Parkway. MD 355 intersects MD 660 (Dodge Street), which is a short connector to MD 28 (Veirs Mill Road) that the route intersects a short distance later.

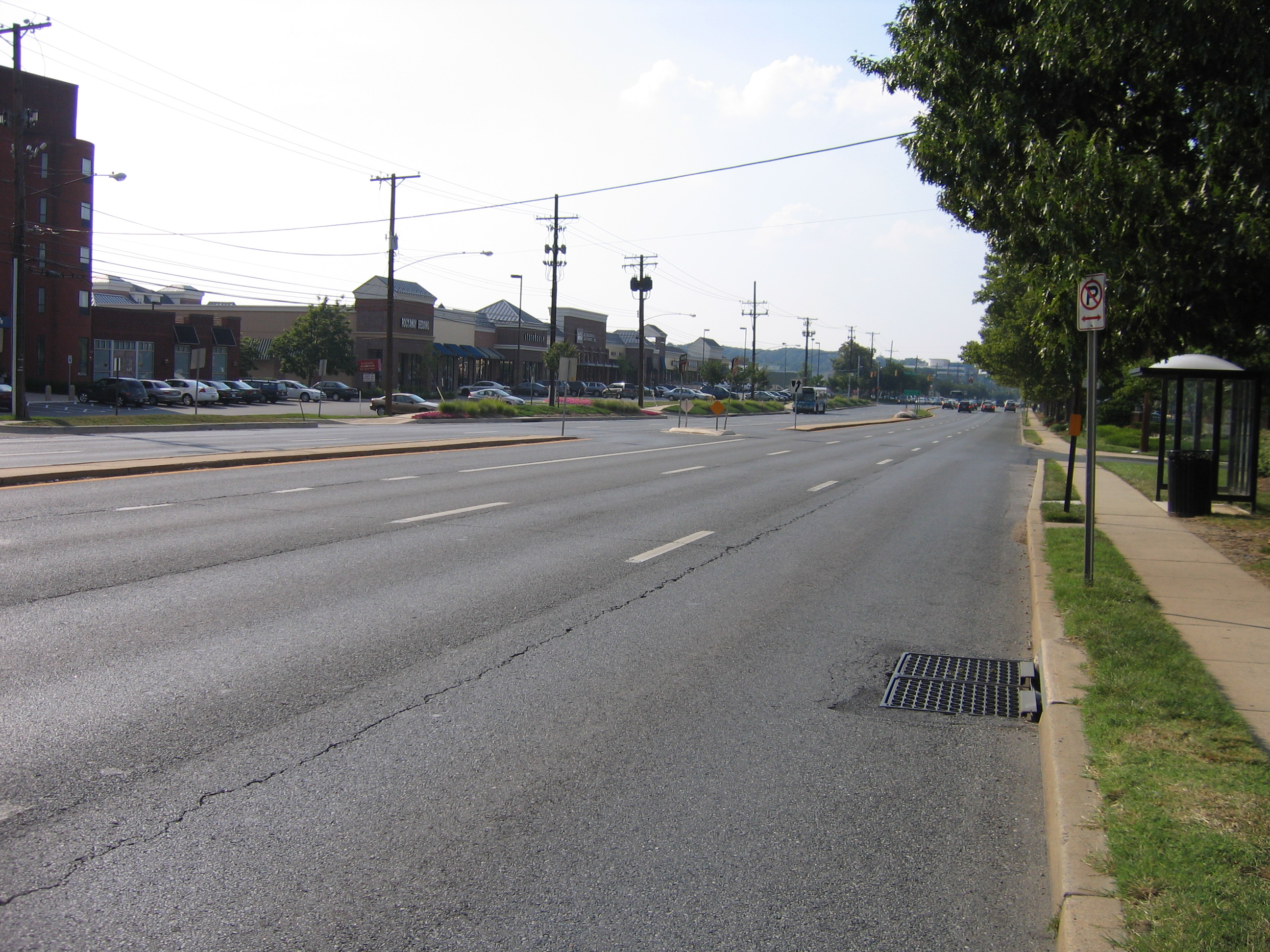
MD 355 northbound at Bouic Avenue in Rockville

Past this intersection, MD 355 continues into downtown Rockville, where it becomes Hungerford Drive. The road passes by the Rockville station, which is used by the Metro's Red Line, MARC's Brunswick Line, and Amtrak's Capitol Limited (MARC and Amtrak trains run along the CSX line). MD 355 heads into more commercial areas and passes the Rockville Campus of Montgomery College before intersecting Gude Drive. Past this intersection, MD 355 becomes Frederick Road and heads northwest into a mix of commercial and residential areas in Derwood, drawing further away from the railroad tracks. The route leaves Rockville and intersects Shady Grove Road. Past Shady Grove Road, MD 355 has an interchange with I-370 and crosses into Gaithersburg. Here, the road heads through more commercial areas before heading into residential neighborhoods. It heads into business areas again and passes northeast of Gaithersburg High School as it approaches downtown Gaithersburg, where the route has an interchange with MD 117 (Diamond Avenue) and passes over CSX's Metropolitan Subdivision before continuing northwest past more businesses. MD 355 passes southwest of the former Lakeforest Mall before intersecting MD 124 (Montgomery Village Avenue). MD 355 passes more strip malls past this intersection before crossing over Great Seneca Creek and leaving Gaithersburg. The route continues northwest into Germantown through residential areas before passing businesses again and intersecting Middlebrook Road. It passes through residential developments, with the road narrowing to four lanes before it reaches an intersection with MD 118 (Germantown Road). From here, the road passes more homes and a shopping center prior to crossing MD 27 (Ridge Road).

Past MD 27, the road passes more suburban developments before narrowing to a two-lane undivided road and heading through some woodland. It continues northwest through a mix of rural woodland and suburban development in Clarksburg, where MD 355 passes northeast of Clarksburg High School and intersects MD 121 (Clarksburg Road). Past this intersection, the route passes Little Bennett Regional Park on the east and businesses on the west, running closely parallel to I-270 located to the west. The route eventually draws farther east of I-270 and heads through residential neighborhoods and woodland before reaching Hyattstown. In Hyattstown, MD 355 intersects MD 109 (Old Hundred Road).

=== Frederick County ===
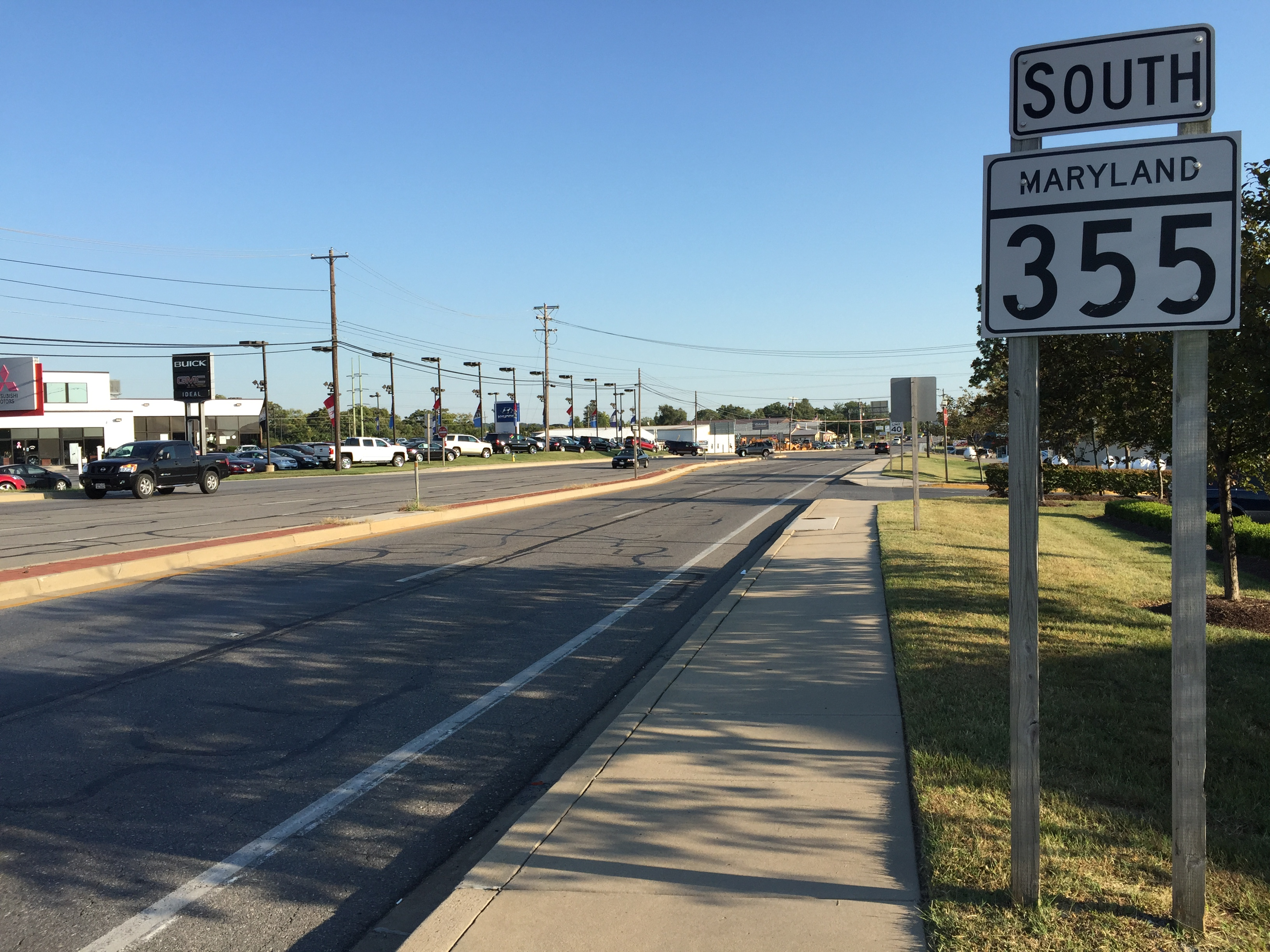
View south along MD 355 at MD 85 in Frederick County

After passing through Hyattstown, MD 355 crosses into Frederick County, where it becomes Urbana Pike. Here, it passes some businesses before intersecting MD 75 (Green Valley Road). Past this intersection, the road continues into a more rural setting consisting of farmland, woods, and some residential areas and businesses. The route reaches Urbana, where it heads onto a four-lane divided bypass called Worthington Boulevard to the east of the community, while the former alignment of MD 355 continues through Urbana as Urbana Pike. MD 355 intersects MD 80 (Fingerboard Road) and passes through residential areas in the Villages of Urbana subdivision, encountering two roundabouts. Upon leaving Urbana, the route intersects Lew Wallace Street and returns to its alignment along two-lane undivided Urbana Pike as it continues north through areas of woods and farms with some rural residences. The road passes Monocacy National Battlefield, the site of the Battle of Monocacy Junction in the American Civil War fought on July 9, 1864. Past the battlefield, the road crosses the Monocacy River and CSX's Old Main Line Subdivision railroad line.

In a short distance, MD 355 heads from rural areas into a commercial district on the outskirts of Frederick. The road widens to four lanes as it passes by the Francis Scott Key Mall and several other businesses. It intersects MD 85 (Buckeystown Pike), which provides access to and from I-70/US 40. MD 355 passes over I-70/US 40 and ends just north of the overpass, with the road continuing north into Frederick as locally maintained Market Street.

== History ==
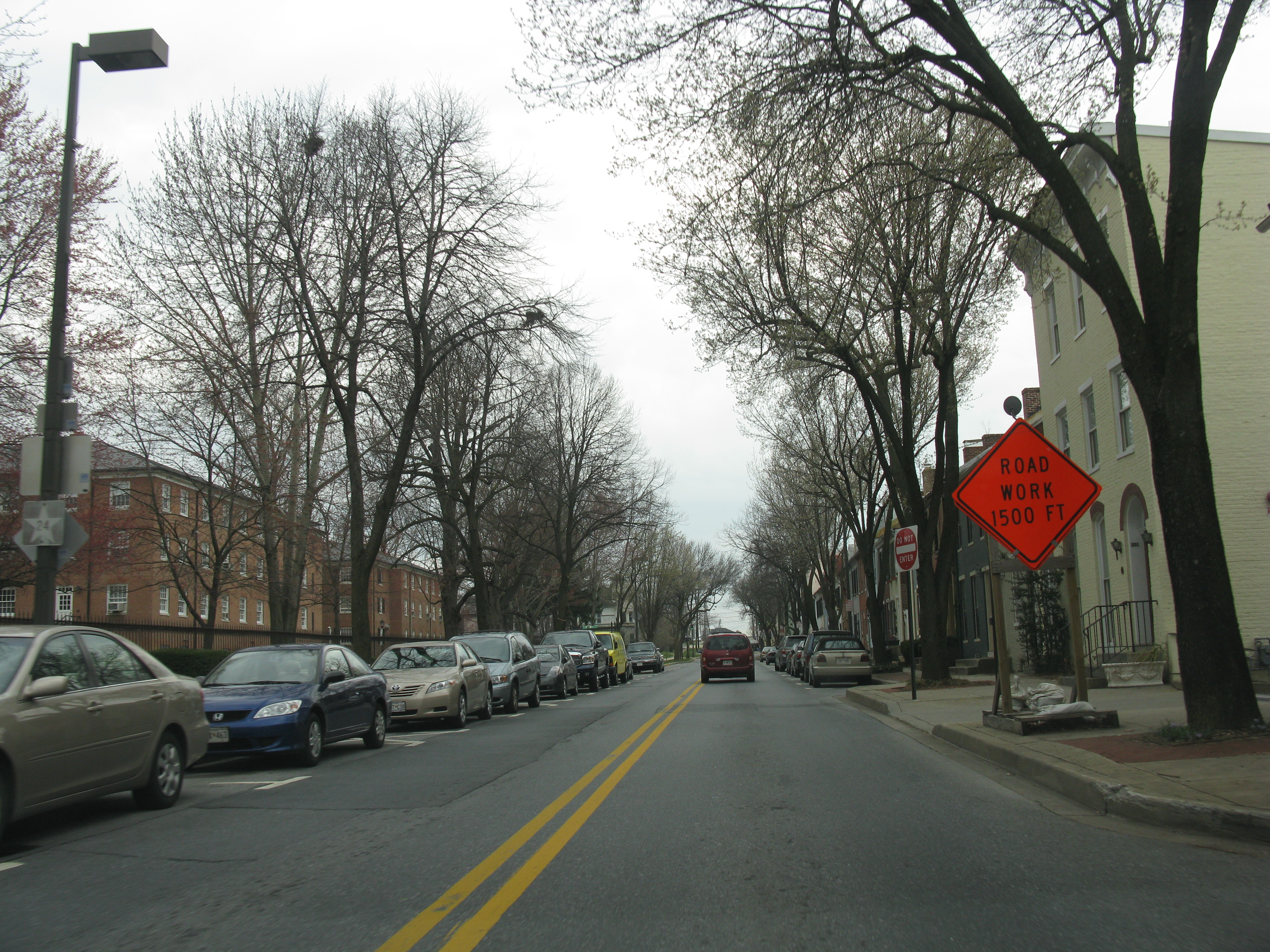
MD 355 on Market Street in Frederick in 2008, a year before the designation was removed from this portion of road

The Rockville Pike portion of MD 355 dates back to what was a Native American trail that led from the mouth of Rock Creek to the great Conestoga Trail. In later times it was used as an escape route from Washington during the War of 1812 as well as a route for settlers to travel from Montgomery County to developing areas north and west.

The stretch in the District of Columbia was renamed Wisconsin Avenue in 1891, as was the part in Bethesda by 1913.

In 1911, a small portion of state highway leading northwest out of Rockville was completed, with the remainder between Rockville and Gaithersburg under contract. A state highway was proposed between Gaithersburg and Germantown. The state road between Gaithersburg and Germantown was finished by 1915.

By 1921, the portions of state highway between the Washington, D.C., border and Rockville, to the northwest of Germantown, and between northwest of Urbana and Frederick were completed. At this time, a state highway was proposed between northwest of Germantown and northwest of Urbana. The state road was completed between Germantown and Clarksburg and through Urbana to a point southeast of the community by 1923. The entire length of the state road connecting Washington, D.C. and Frederick was completed by 1927. In the approved plan for the U.S. Highway System in 1926, US 240 was planned to run from Washington, D.C. to Harrisburg, Pennsylvania via Frederick. In 1927, US 240 was designated along the proposed 1926 route south of US 15/US 40 in Frederick with the US 15 designation given to the road north of Frederick. In 1950, US 240 was widened into a divided highway between the Washington, D.C. border and Bethesda.

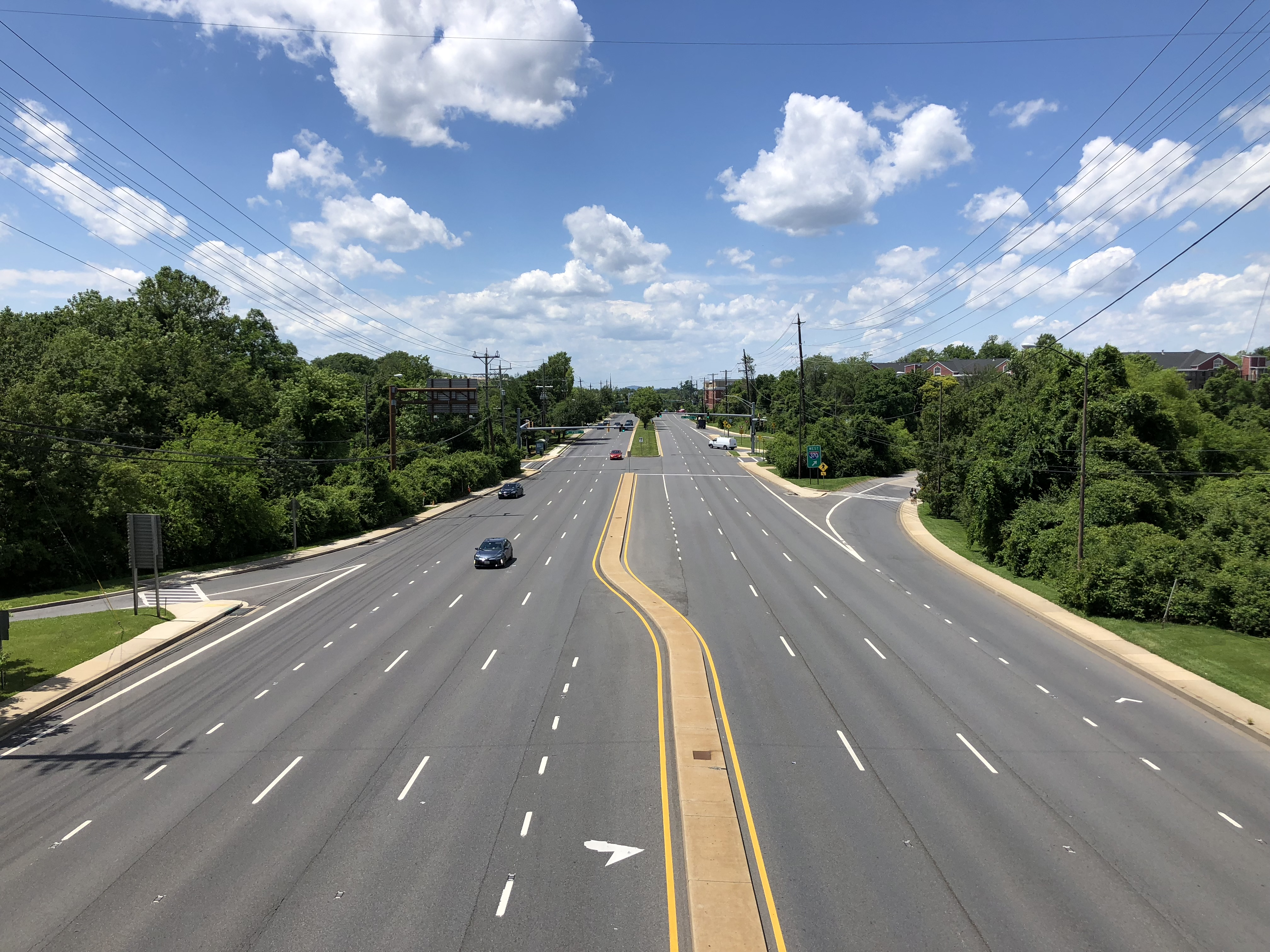
MD 355 northbound viewed from I-370 between Rockville and Gaithersburg

In 1947, plans were made to construct a freeway, the Washington National Pike (now I-270), parallel to US 240. In 1953, the US 240 freeway was completed between MD 121 in Clarksburg and US 15 (now MD 85) in Frederick. The former alignment of US 240 between Clarksburg and Frederick was designated as US 240 Alt. A year later, the freeway was extended down to MD 118 in Germantown. At this time, the original alignment between Germantown and Frederick was designated MD 355, replacing what was US 240 between Germantown and Clarksburg and the entire length of US 240 Alt. between Clarksburg and Frederick. The US 240 freeway was extended south to MD 28 in Rockville in 1956, and MD 355 was subsequently extended south along the former alignment to the MD 28 intersection in Rockville. Also, the US 240 freeway was completed from US 15 north to US 40. In 1957, US 240 was upgraded to a divided highway between Bethesda and Rockville. The US 240 freeway was extended south to Montrose Road in 1958, resulting in MD 355 being extended south along the former alignment to Montrose Road. I-70S was designated onto the US 240 freeway in 1959. In addition, MD 355 was extended north to US 15 north of Frederick, passing through the city on Market Street, the one-way pair of Market Street northbound and Bentz Street southbound in the downtown area, and Market Street to the north of downtown. The route replaced US 15/US 240 south of downtown Frederick and US 15 north of downtown Frederick, with US 15 shifted to a bypass west of the city. In 1960, I-70S/US 240 was extended south to the Capital Beltway, and MD 355 was extended south along former US 240 between Montrose Road and the Capital Beltway.

In 1972, the American Association of State Highway Officials approved for the US 240 designation to be removed. As a result, MD 355 was extended south along the former US 240 alignment to the Washington, D.C. border. MD 355 was widened into a divided highway between Rockville and Gaithersburg in 1977. The divided highway was extended north from Gaithersburg to Germantown by 1997. In 2006, the northern terminus of MD 355 at the interchange with US 15 in Frederick was truncated to a dead end a short distance south of that route. In 2009, the portion of MD 355 north of the I-70 overpass was transferred to the city of Frederick, with the MD 355 designation officially being removed from this stretch. In 2010, an interchange was completed at Montrose Parkway.

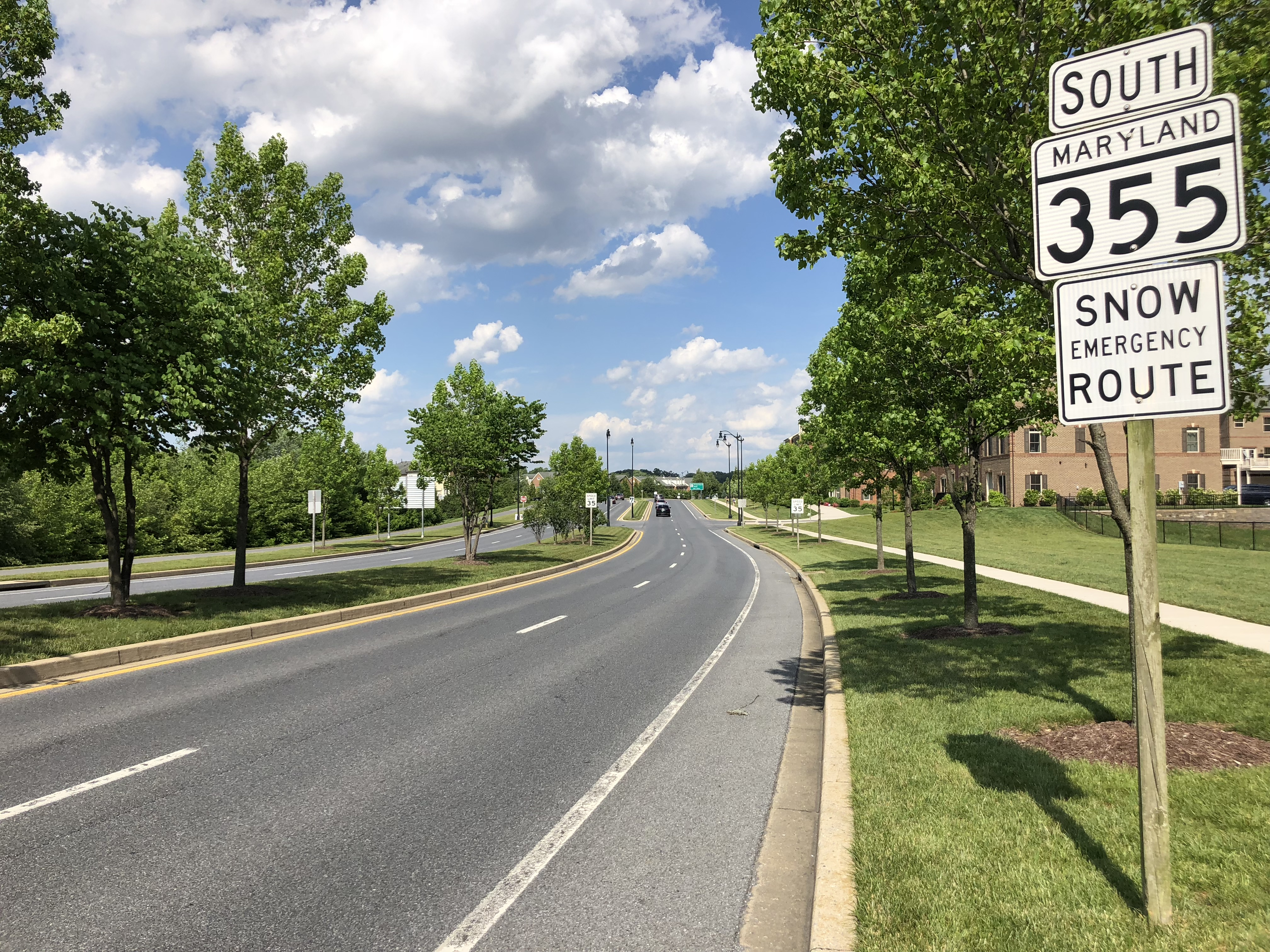
MD 355 southbound along Worthington Boulevard in Urbana

In Frederick County, the two bridges that carry portions of MD 355 receive annual inspections, as part of the Federal Highway Administration's National Bridge Inventory (NBI). The Monocacy River crossing was built in 1930, and reconstructed in 1980. Its June 2016 NBI report noted that this bridge is possibly eligible to be listed on the National Register of Historic Places. The CSX crossing was built in 1931, but never reconstructed. This bridge's NBI report, from September 2016, determined that its deck was in poor condition, with advanced section loss or deterioration. The 2016 inspection reports for both bridges concluded that both of these MD 355 carriers' deck geometries were "[b]asically intolerable requiring high priority of replacement."

A four-lane divided bypass of Urbana was constructed for MD 355 in the 2000s. The primary reason for constructing the bypass was to relieve traffic heading through the community brought on by the construction of numerous shopping centers in the area, and the costs for constructing the bypass were entirely paid for by the developers of an area shopping center. The proposal for the bypass called for two roundabouts to control traffic. The first portion of the road opened in late 2005 from MD 355 south to a roundabout at Sugarloaf Parkway. On October 30, 2008, construction began to build the connection of the bypass to MD 355 south of MD 80. The bypass was completed by January 2009, at which point MD 355 was realigned onto it and the former alignment became MD 355 Bus. In 2013, maintenance of the bypass of MD 355 around Urbana was transferred from the developers to the state.

== Junction list ==
County	Location	mi	km	Destinations	Notes
Montgomery	Bethesda	0.00	0.00	Western Avenue NW / Wisconsin Avenue NW south	District of Columbia border (the District controls the entirety of Western Avenue); southern terminus
Montgomery	Bethesda	1.14	1.83	MD 191 west (Bradley Boulevard) / Bradley Lane east	Eastern terminus of MD 191
Montgomery	Bethesda	1.62	2.61	MD 187 east (Montgomery Lane) / MD 410 east (Montgomery Avenue)	Eastbound direction of MD 187; eastern terminus of MD 187; eastbound direction of MD 410
Montgomery	Bethesda	1.70	2.74	MD 187 north (Old Georgetown Road) / MD 410 west (East–West Highway)	Westbound direction of MD 410; western terminus of MD 410; southern terminus of MD 187
Montgomery	Bethesda	3.96	6.37	I-495 (Capital Beltway) / I-270 north – Baltimore, Silver Spring, Frederick, Northern Virginia	Interchange; I-495 exit 34; no access from MD 355 south to I-495 north or I-270 north
Montgomery	Bethesda			Grosvenor Lane to Beach Drive	Northbound access only
Montgomery	North Bethesda	5.27	8.48	MD 547 east (Strathmore Avenue)	Western terminus of MD 547
Montgomery	Rockville	6.59	10.61	Montrose Parkway (MD 927A) to Randolph Road	Interchange
Montgomery	Rockville	8.71	14.02	MD 911 north (First Street) to MD 28 east / MD 586	Southern terminus of MD 911
Montgomery	Rockville	9.05	14.56	MD 660 north (Dodge Street) to MD 28 east	Southern terminus of unsigned MD 660
Montgomery	Rockville	9.17	14.76	MD 28 (Jefferson Street/Veirs Mill Road) to I-270 / MD 586	No access from MD 355 north to MD 28 east
Montgomery	Gaithersburg	12.68	20.41	I-370 west (Intercounty Connector) to I-270	Interchange; no exit to eastbound I-370; I-370 exit 2
Montgomery	Gaithersburg	14.38	23.14	MD 117 west (West Diamond Avenue) / Fulks Corner Avenue	Interchange; access to and from northbound MD 355 provided by Fulks Corner Avenue
Montgomery	Gaithersburg	15.43	24.83	MD 124 (Montgomery Village Avenue) to I-270	
Montgomery	Germantown	18.81	30.27	MD 118 south (Germantown Road) to I-270 – Germantown, Montgomery College	Northern terminus of MD 118
Montgomery	Germantown	19.70	31.70	MD 27 north (Ridge Road) – Germantown, Damascus	Southern terminus of MD 27
Montgomery	Clarksburg	22.90	36.85	MD 121 south (Clarksburg Road) – Boyds, Frederick	Northern terminus of MD 121; officially MD 121A
Montgomery	Hyattstown	26.45	42.57	MD 109 south (Old Hundred Road) to I-270 – Comus, Frederick, Washington	Northern terminus of MD 109
Frederick		27.07	43.56	MD 75 north (Green Valley Road)	Southern terminus of MD 75
Frederick	Urbana	30.25	48.68	MD 80 (Fingerboard Road) to I-270 – Buckeystown, Kemptown	
Frederick	Frederick	36.59	58.89	MD 85 (Buckeystown Pike) to I-70 / I-270 / US 40 – Baltimore	
Frederick	Frederick	36.75	59.14	Market Street north – Downtown Frederick	Northern terminus
1.000 mi = 1.609 km; 1.000 km = 0.621 mi: Incomplete access

== Related routes ==
=== MD 355 Business ===
Maryland Route 355 Business
- Location: Urbana
- Length: 1.06 mi (1.71 km)

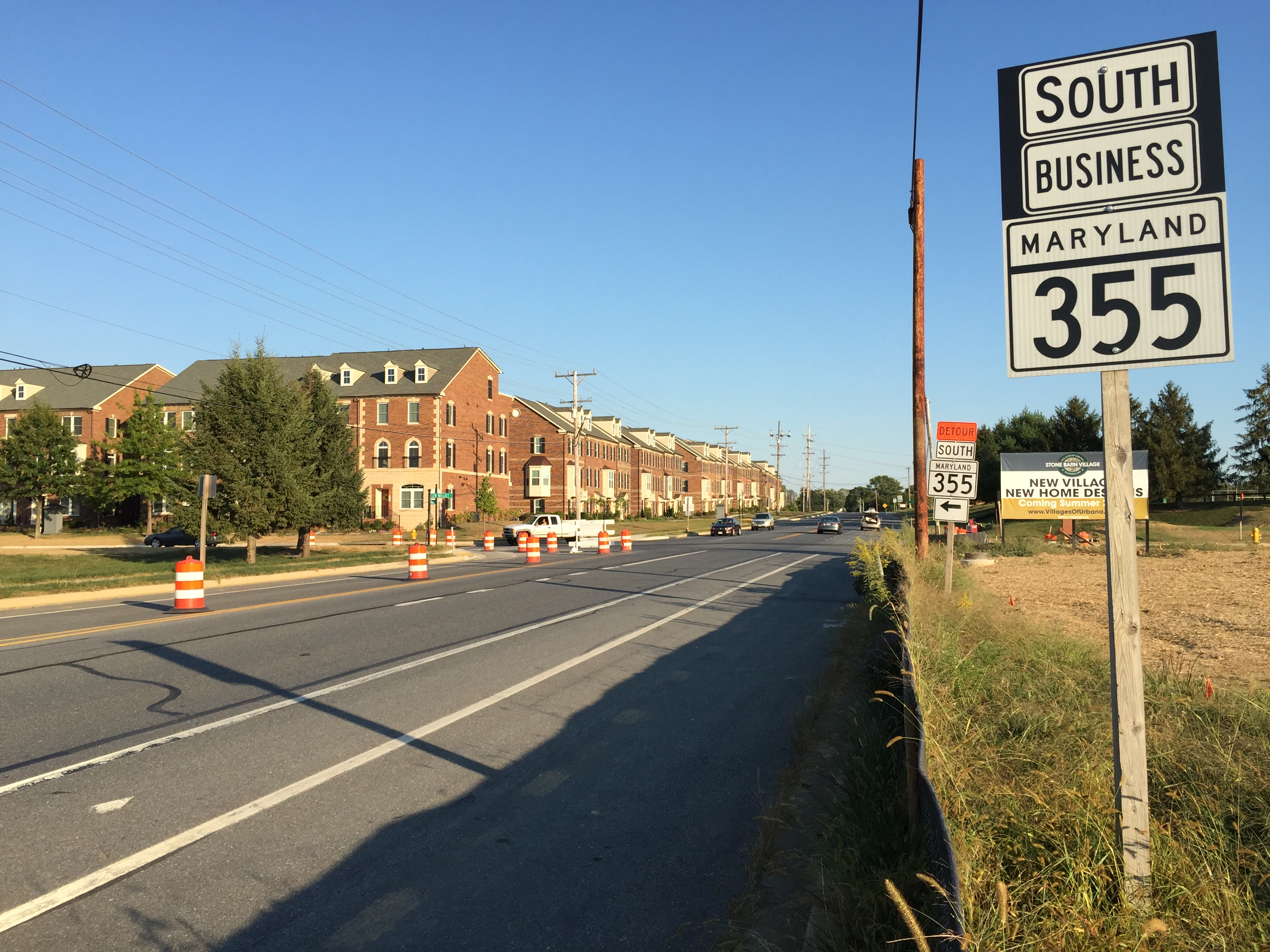
View south along MD 355 Bus. at MD 355 in Urbana in 2016

Maryland Route 355 Business (MD 355 Bus.) was the designation of a 1.06-mile (1.71 km) business route of MD 355 in Urbana that ran along Urbana Pike. The route began at MD 355 south of Urbana, heading west as a two-lane undivided road and coming to an intersection with MD 80. Past this intersection, the road continued northwest through residential areas. The business route reached its terminus at another intersection with MD 355. The entire length of MD 355 Bus. originally followed MD 355C. In 2014, all of MD 355C except for a 0.376-mile (0.605 km) portion between a point south of Urbana Church Road and Sprigg Street was turned over to county maintenance. The remainder of MD 355C was turned over to county maintenance in an agreement dated December 8, 2017.

Junction list
The entire route was in Urbana, Frederick County.

mi	km	Destinations	Notes
0.00	0.00	MD 355 (Worthington Boulevard/Urbana Pike)	Southern terminus
0.22	0.35	MD 80 (Fingerboard Road) to I-270 – Buckeystown, Kemptown	
1.06	1.71	MD 355 (Urbana Pike/Worthington Boulevard)	Northern terminus
1.000 mi = 1.609 km; 1.000 km = 0.621 mi

=== Auxiliary routes ===
- MD 355A runs along an unnamed road from MD 355 north to a cul-de-sac in Frederick, Frederick County. The route is 0.05 mi (0.080 km) long.
- MD 355B ran along an unnamed road from MD 355 Bus. east to a dead end in Urbana, Frederick County. The route was 0.12 mi (0.19 km) long. MD 355B was turned over to county maintenance in 2014.
