= Edgar Berman =

American surgeon and author

Edgar F. Berman (August 6, 1915 – November 25, 1987) was an American surgeon and author. He is most remembered for his 1970 assertion that women were unable to hold leadership positions due to their "raging hormonal imbalances". He also implanted a plastic esophagus into a person and performed a heart transplant for a dog.

== Early life and career ==
Berman was born in Baltimore, Maryland. He attended Baltimore City College, the University of Maryland and the University of Maryland School of Medicine.

Berman was in the Marine Corps during World War II, serving in Iwo Jima and Guam. In 1950, he implanted the first plastic esophagus into a person. In 1957, he performed a heart transplant for a dog.

Berman was the president of Medico, an organization involved with health care in developing countries, from 1959 to 1965. From 1964 to 1969 he was a confidant of, and personal physician to, Vice President Hubert Humphrey, advising him on medical issues.

In 1970, Berman controversially asserted that women were unable to hold leadership positions due to their "raging hormonal imbalances". Following the comment he was forced to resign from his post on the Democratic National Committee's Committee on National Priorities. His assertion was refuted by leaders of the women's movement, including endocrinologist Estelle Ramey.

Berman self-identified as a male chauvinist and wrote the 1982 book The Compleat Chauvinist: A Survival Guide for the Bedeviled Male. He considered the book to be revenge against "militant feminists", whom he referred to as "Steingreers" and "Steinzugs". In an interview with The New York Times that year, he said "The women all hate me, and the men all think I'm their leader."

== Later life ==
Berman served on the board of directors of the Public Welfare Foundation for 20 years.

Berman retired to a 50-acre horse farm in Lutherville, Maryland. He wrote five books and columns for USA Today. Following a heart attack, he died on November 25, 1987, at Sinai Hospital in Baltimore.

== Awards and honors ==
One of Johns Hopkins' first endowed professorships, the Edgar Berman Professorship in International Health, is named after Berman.
