= Oakmont, Maryland =

Village in Montgomery County, Maryland, United States

Oakmont
- Incorporated Town
- Town of Oakmont
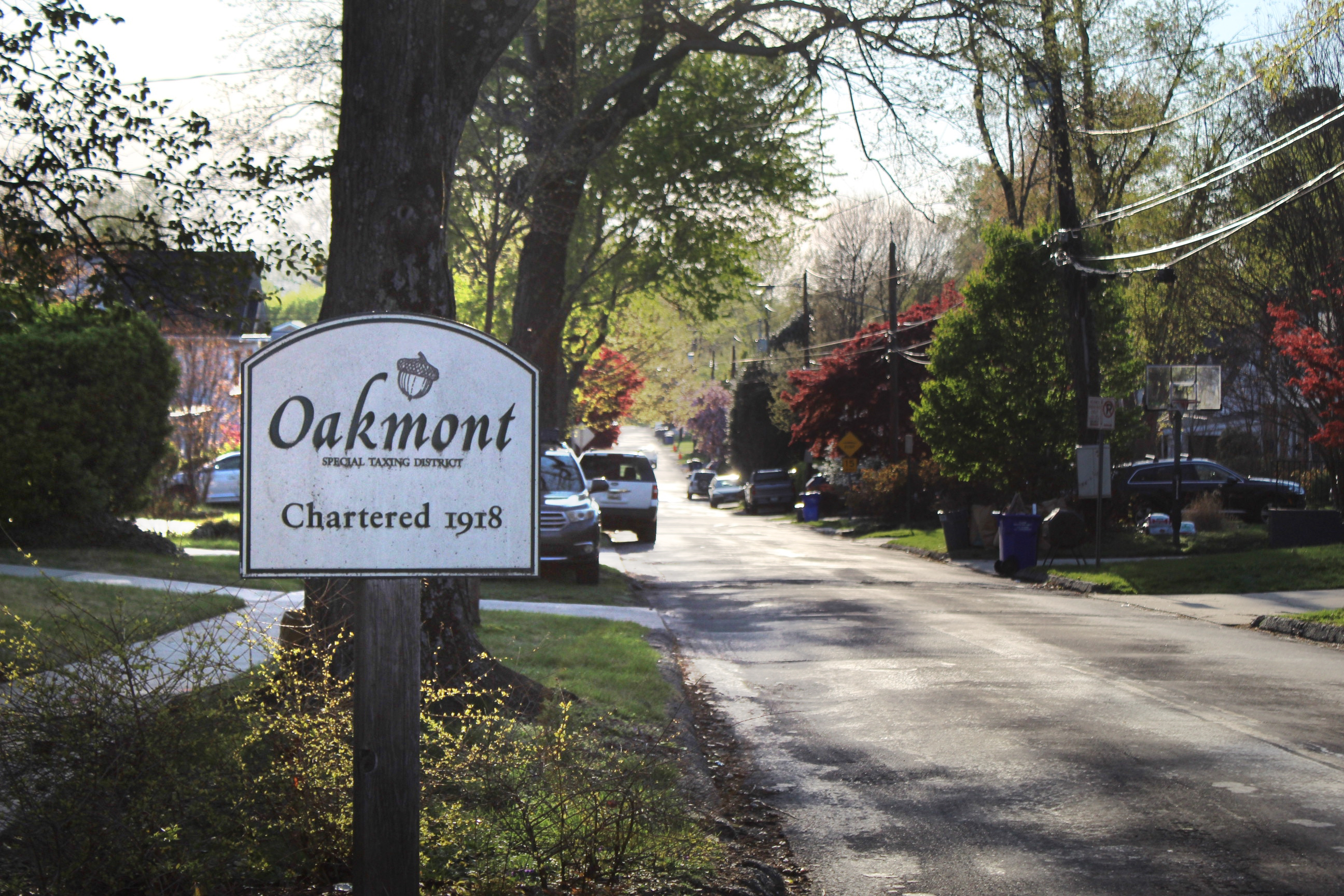
- Oakmont's Charter Date Sign at the top of Oakmont Avenue.

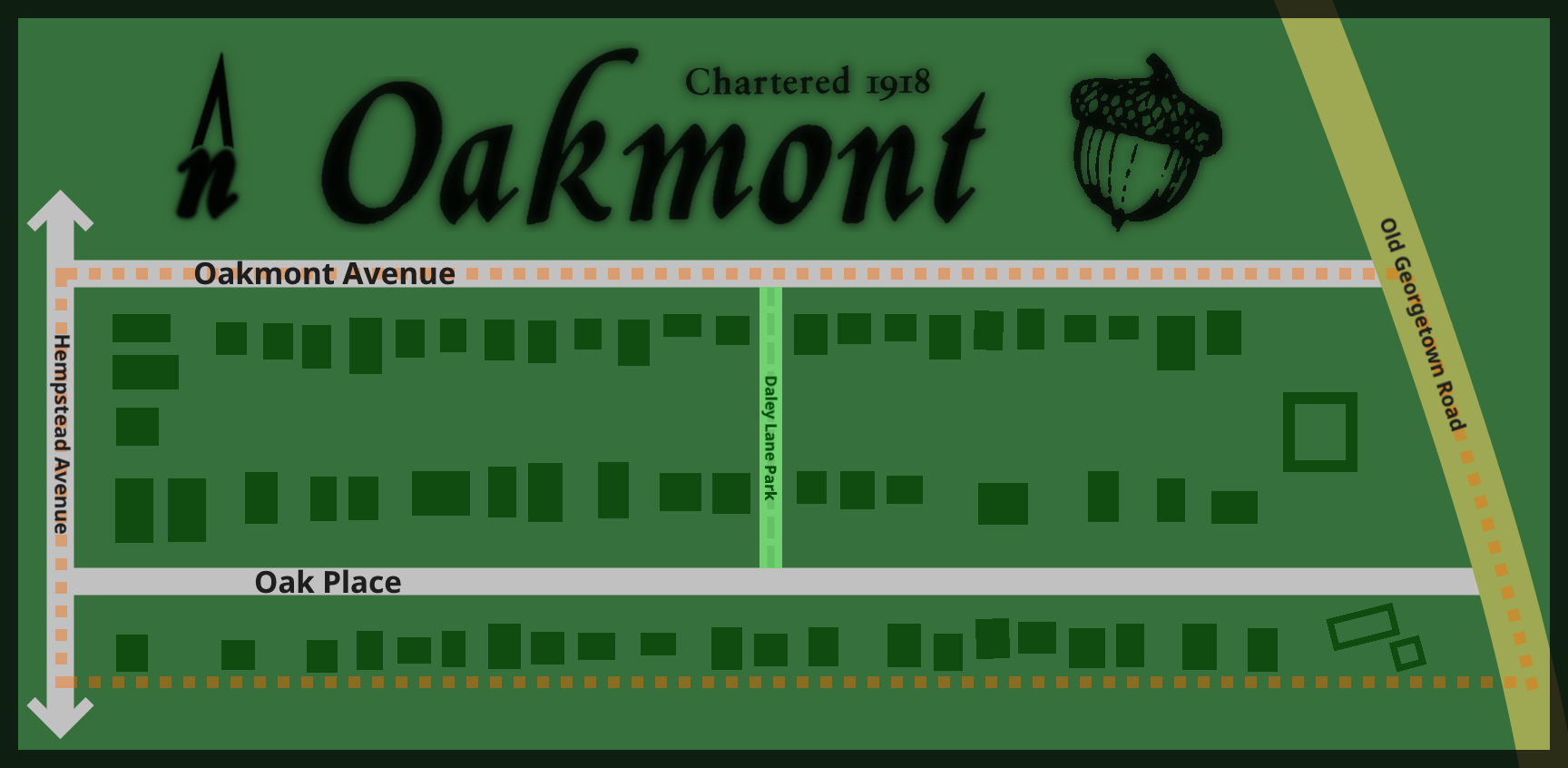
- Graphical map of the Town of Oakmont, Maryland.

- Location within Maryland

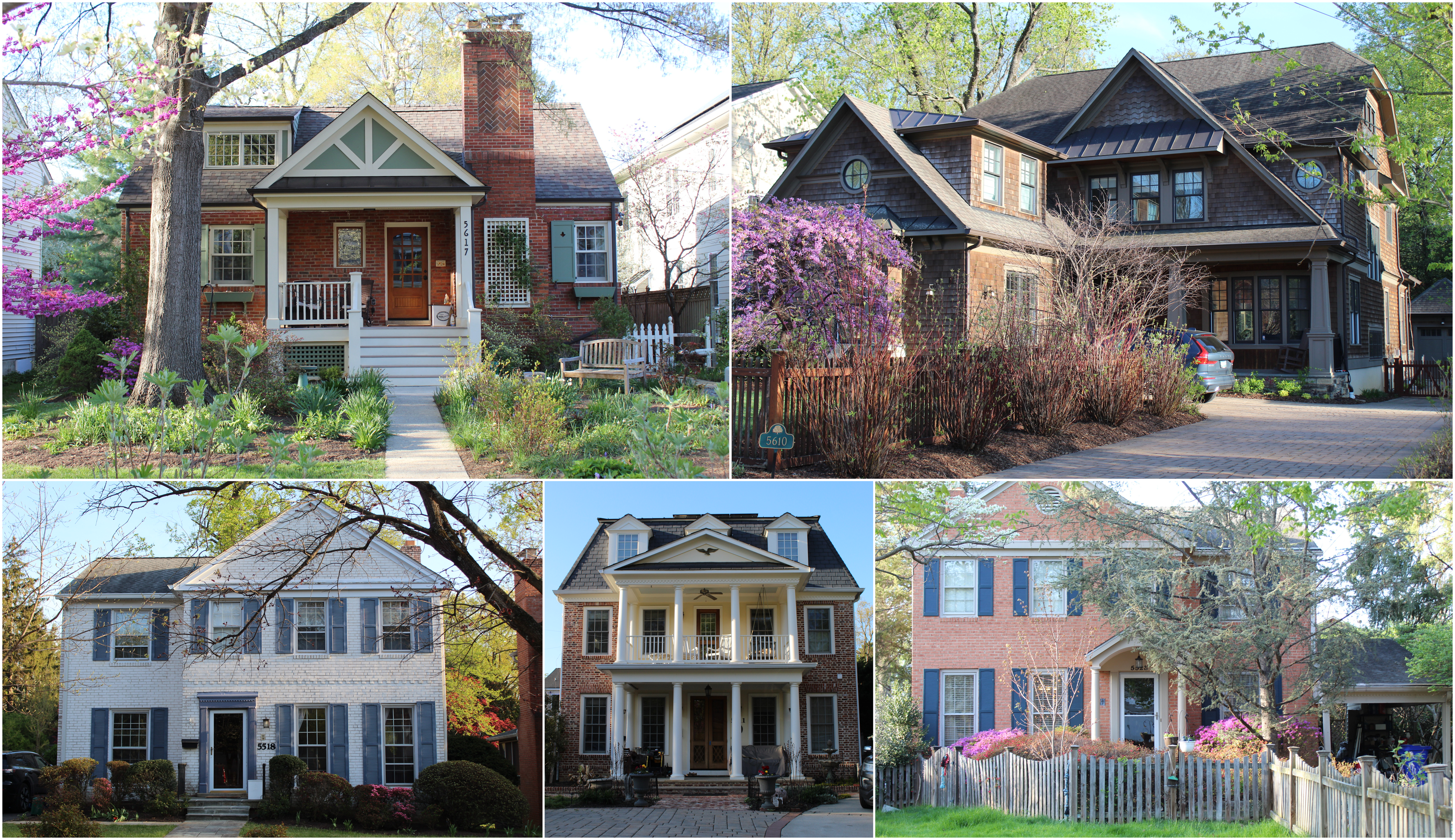
An array of stately homes in the Town of Oakmont, four of which are on Oak Place and one of which is on Oakmont Avenue.

Oakmont is an incorporated village and special taxing district in Montgomery County, Maryland, United States. Chartered in 1918, the village includes both sides of Oak Place and the south side of Oakmont Avenue, across Old Georgetown Road from the National Institutes of Health, in the Bethesda postal area.

The village has approximately 145 inhabitants across 52 homes, and is governed by a three-person council. Oakmont is responsible for its own municipal services, such as trash collection and snow removal, but contracts the fulfillment of these services out to Montgomery County.

== History ==
In 1891, the Tenallytown and Rockville Railway (T&R) began trolley service north from Washington, D.C. through Bethesda. In that same year, an amusement park known eponymously as Bethesda Park opened for business; it drew in massive crowds from throughout the metropolitan area, and invested ambitiously in new attractions year over year. The park was short-lived though, when a hurricane and ensuing electrical fire destroyed the Park completely in August of 1896. It was never rebuilt.

During its peak, the T&R ran trains to Bethesda Park every 30 minutes all week and every 15 minutes on Sundays. After the Park's destruction in 1896, many saw the cleared park grounds, and the surrounding wilds, as ripe for settlement. Homes and businesses began to spring up in the area, and the homes along either side of modern-day Oak Place were chartered as the Town of Oakmont.

For much of Oakmont's history, the town's homes sat entirely along Oak Place; the south side of modern-day Oakmont Avenue was consumed by spacious back lots for homes on the "main" road of Oak Place. Years after Oakmont avenue was laid and homes were built along its northern side, it was agreed that the roadway would belong to the county at large while Oak Place's rear lots would be redeveloped into homes on the south side of Oakmont Avenue.
