= Estelle Ramey =

American scientist and educator

Estelle R. Ramey
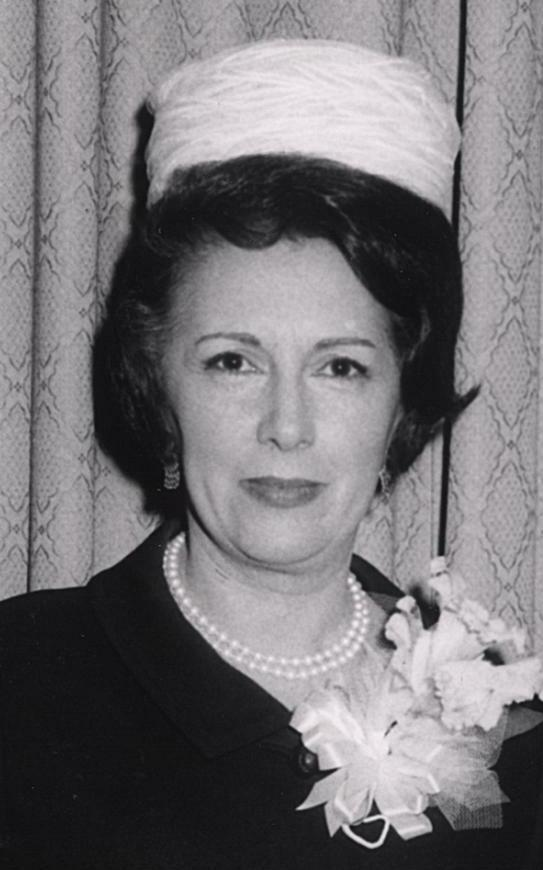
- Ramey in 1966
- Born: Stella Rosemary Rubin; August 27, 1917; Detroit, Michigan, United States
- Died: September 8, 2006 (aged 89); Bethesda, Maryland, United States
- Occupations: Endocrinologist and educator
- Spouse: James T. Ramey (m. 1941)
- Children: 2

Estelle Rosemary Ramey (August 23, 1917 – September 8, 2006) was an American endocrinologist, physiologist and feminist who became internationally known for refuting surgeon and Democratic Party leader Edgar Berman, who stated that women were unfit to hold high public office because of "raging hormonal imbalances." Ramey's balanced approach to life was embodied in a later quote, "I have loved. And been loved. And all the rest is background music."

== Early life ==
Born Stella Rosemary Rubin in Detroit, Michigan to Jewish immigrant parents, Ramey grew up in Brooklyn, New York after moving with her family as an infant. She was named by her mother as a "star." A French immigrant, her mother had a third-grade education and was illiterate. Throughout her childhood, Ramey's mother encouraged her and her siblings to pursue education. In grade school, a teacher insisted that she formalize her name as Estelle in order to register. Ramey's father died when she was a teenager.

=== Education ===
Ramey graduated from high school at 15 and earned a bachelor's degree in mathematics and biology from Brooklyn College at 19. In the midst of the Great Depression, she earned a $750-a-year teaching fellowship at Queens College in New York and later obtained her master's degree in physical chemistry from Columbia University in 1940. In 1941 she married the lawyer James T. Ramey, with whom she went on to have two children. In 1950, she received a doctorate in physiology from the University of Chicago. Throughout her lifetime, Ramey was awarded 14 honorary degrees. She was the first woman faculty member at the University of Chicago Medical School.

== Teaching and research ==
In 1941, Ramey applied for a job at the University of Tennessee Department of Chemistry, but was refused after being told she "ought to go home and take care of my husband." After the United States entered World War II just a few months later, the department chairman offered Ramey a position teaching thermodynamics and biochemistry to military cadets.

Ramey was emeritus professor of physiology and biophysics at the Georgetown University School of Medicine.

== Political controversy ==
In 1970, Dr. Edgar Berman, a retired surgeon, dismissed U.S. Representative Patsy Mink's call for action on women's rights during a session of the Democratic Party's Committee on National Priorities. Asserting what he considered severe differences between men and women, Berman insisted that women's

raging storms of monthly hormonal imbalances" made them unfit for high office. He said, "Suppose that we had a menopausal woman president who had to make the decision of the Bay of the Pigs? ... All things being equal, I would still rather have had a male JFK make the Cuban missile crisis decisions than a female of similar age."

As an endocrinologist, Ramey wrote letters to the Washington Evening Star and The Washington Post criticizing Berman's claims. In one letter, she wrote that she was "startled to learn that ovarian hormones are toxic to brain cells," and also mentioned that during the Cuban Missile Crisis, President John F. Kennedy was suffering from Addison's disease and that his medications for that severe hormonal disorder were capable of causing severe mood swings.

The Women's National Press Club hosted a debate between Ramey and Berman in which he opened with, "I really love women." Ramey responded: "So did Henry VIII." According to The Washington Post Ramey had dominated the debate with Berman. Following the debate, Berman resigned from the Democratic National Committee and Ramey became a public speaker on women's rights.

== Publications ==
Ramey published over 150 research articles throughout her lifetime. In 1971, she published a story in the first issue of Ms. magazine entitled, "Male Cycles (They Have Them, Too)."

== Honors and awards ==
In 1989, Ramey was inducted into the Maryland Women's Hall of Fame. Since 2000, the Georgetown University Medical Center presents an annual Estelle Ramey Mentorship Award to "honor faculty who have provided outstanding encouragement, support, and mentorship for GUMC women faculty to reach their maximum professional potential." Women and men are eligible for the award. Ramey also participated in two interviews with Columbia University's Oral History Research project.
