= Suburban Hospital =

Hospital in Bethesda, Maryland, US

- Johns Hopkins Health System

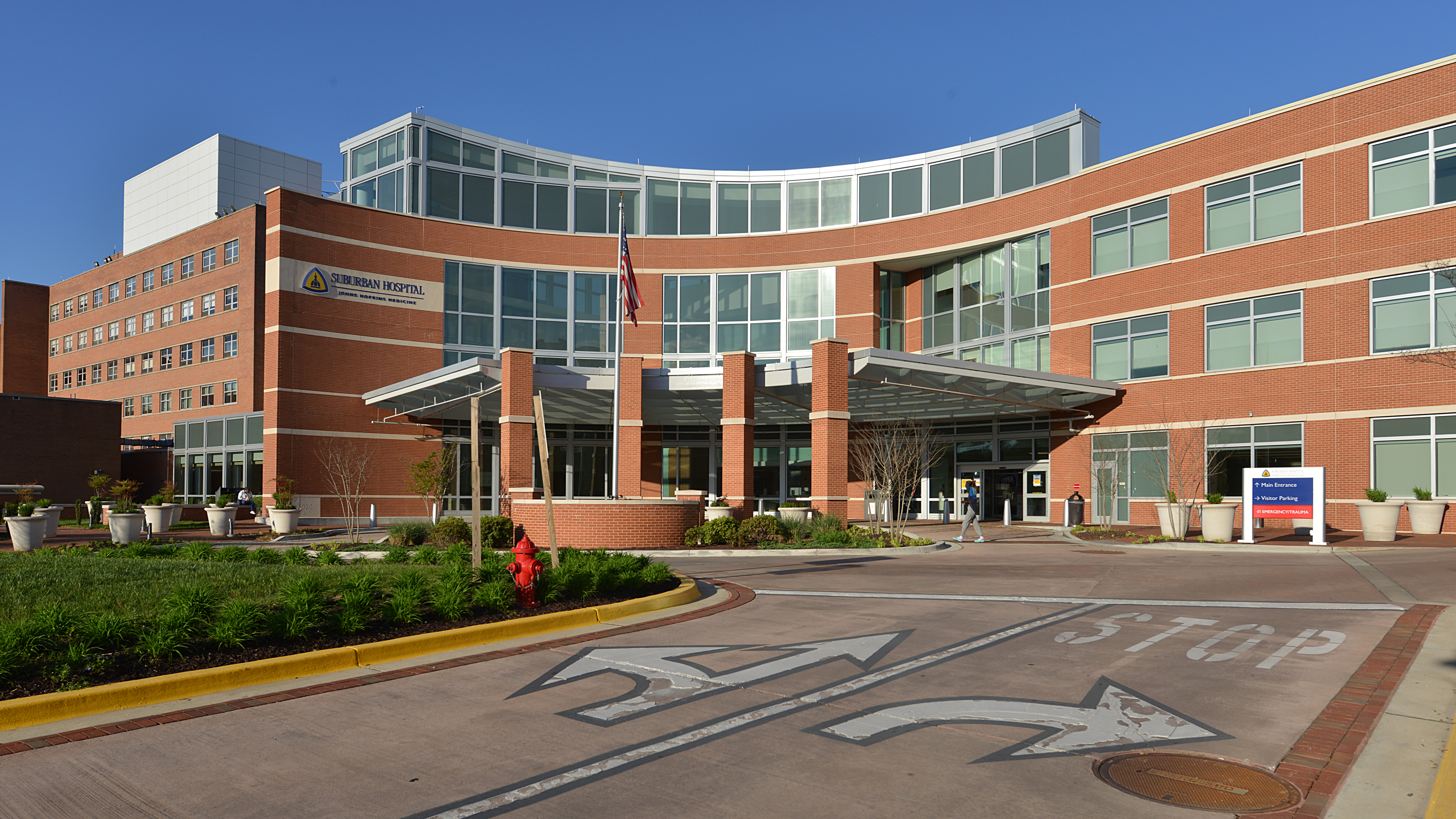
- Suburban Hospital Main Campus

Geography
- Location: 8600 Old Georgetown Road; Bethesda, Montgomery County, Maryland, Maryland, United States
- Coordinates: 38.9974266°N 77.1104762°W

Organization
- Care system: Nonprofit
- Type: Community-based
- Affiliated university: Johns Hopkins Medicine

Services
- Emergency department: Level II trauma center
- Beds: 230

Helipads
- Helipad: (FAA LID: 5MD9)

History
- Founded: 1943

Links
- Website: www.suburbanhospital.org
- Lists: Hospitals in Maryland

Suburban Hospital is a community-based, not-for-profit hospital serving Montgomery County, Maryland, and the surrounding area since 1943. Located in Bethesda, Maryland, Suburban is the designated trauma center for Montgomery County. Suburban Hospital is affiliated with many local health-care organizations, including the National Institutes of Health. The hospital specializes in surgery, orthopedics, cardiology, neurology, oncology, emergency/trauma and a variety of additional clinical services. On June 30, 2009, Suburban Hospital became a member of Johns Hopkins Medicine.

The hospital was rated as high performing in 2 adult specialties and 7 procedures/conditions.

== History ==
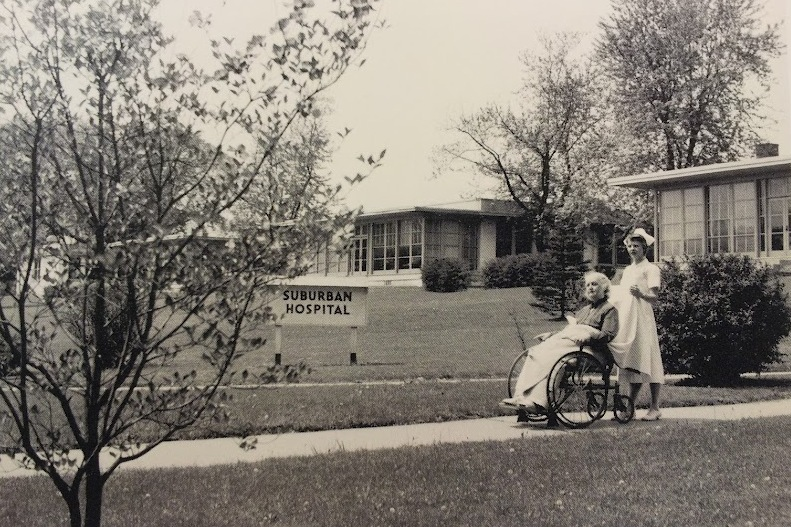
A nurse with her patient at the original Suburban Hospital in 1943

On December 13, 1943, Suburban Hospital opened its doors as a 130-bed hospital constructed to accommodate the expanding World War II military population in rural Montgomery County, Maryland. In its first full year, the small facility, consisting of several one story cottages, admitted 3,000 patients and had an operating budget of $13,000.

In 1950, the hospital was purchased by the community from the federal government for $125,000. During the late 1950s, the hospital experienced a severe shortage of beds, requiring administrators to enclose sun porches and convert clinic space to accommodate patients. To alleviate the overflow of patients, the Suburban Hospital Association developed a master facility plan to construct three new wings over the next decade.

== Campus enhancement project ==
On February 7, 2008, Suburban Hospital unveiled its plans for the first major upgrade and enhancement of its facilities and campus in nearly 30 years. The last major upgrade to its facilities was in 1979.

The proposed improvements will be built on Suburban's existing campus at 8600 Old Georgetown Road, across from its key clinical partner, the National Institutes of Health (NIH). Major features include improved access to the emergency/trauma center; more private patient rooms; larger operating rooms; onsite physician offices; and more parking. Details include:

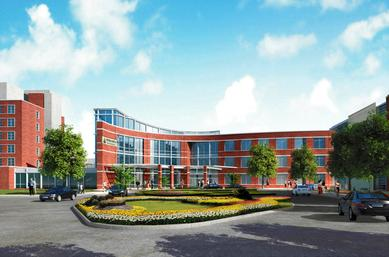
Rendering of new building; one component of the Campus Enhancement Plan.

- A new building addition consisting of approximately 300,000 square feet. The building will house a new surgical wing, physician office space and private patient rooms and will be four stories in height.
- A new surgical wing containing 15 state-of-the-art operating rooms to replace existing operating rooms. Each operating room measures approximately 700 square feet and is designed to accommodate important technological advancements, such as MRI-guided surgery. All of the new operating rooms will be located on one floor, near the emergency/trauma center, allowing for greater efficiencies and better patient flow.
- Improved vehicular and pedestrian circulation, including orientation of traffic to Old Georgetown Road.
- Improved emergency and trauma access, including a new main entrance that will separate the pedestrian and private vehicle entrance from the helipad and emergency vehicle entrance.
- A sustainable design that incorporates green building initiatives.
- Separate elevators for patients and non-patients.
- Replacement of the existing parking garage with a new 1,200-space parking garage to address the parking needs of the new building and the current parking shortage.
- A landscape program to include gardens, greenways, trees and paths.
- Mechanical systems housed below grade to minimize noise and enhance aesthetics.
