= Maryland Route 187 =

State highway in Maryland, United States

Maryland Route 187
- Old Georgetown Road
- Maryland Route 187 highlighted in red

Route information
- Maintained by MDSHA
- Length: 5.04 mi (8.11 km)
- Existed: 1927–present

Major junctions
- South end: MD 355 / MD 410 in Bethesda
- MD 188 in Bethesda; I-495 in Bethesda; I-270 in Rockville
- North end: Executive Boulevard in Rockville.

Location
- Country: United States
- State: Maryland
- Counties: Montgomery

Highway system
- Maryland highway system; Interstate; US; State; Scenic Byways
← MD 186	→ MD 188

Maryland Route 187 (MD 187) is a state highway in the U.S. state of Maryland. Known as Old Georgetown Road, the highway runs 5.32 miles (8.56 km) from MD 355 and MD 410 in Bethesda north to Executive Boulevard in Rockville. MD 187 is a four- to six-lane highway that runs parallel to MD 355 through suburban areas of southern Montgomery County. The highway was paved through Bethesda by 1910. The remainder of MD 187 was constructed in the mid- to late 1920s. The highway was relocated at its northern end and expanded to a divided highway over most of its length in the late 1960s. MD 187's interchanges with Interstate 270 (I-270) and I-495 were built in the late 1950s and early 1960s, respectively; the former interchange was reconstructed in the early 2000s. The northern terminus was cut back from MD 355 to Executive Boulevard in 2016.

== Route description ==
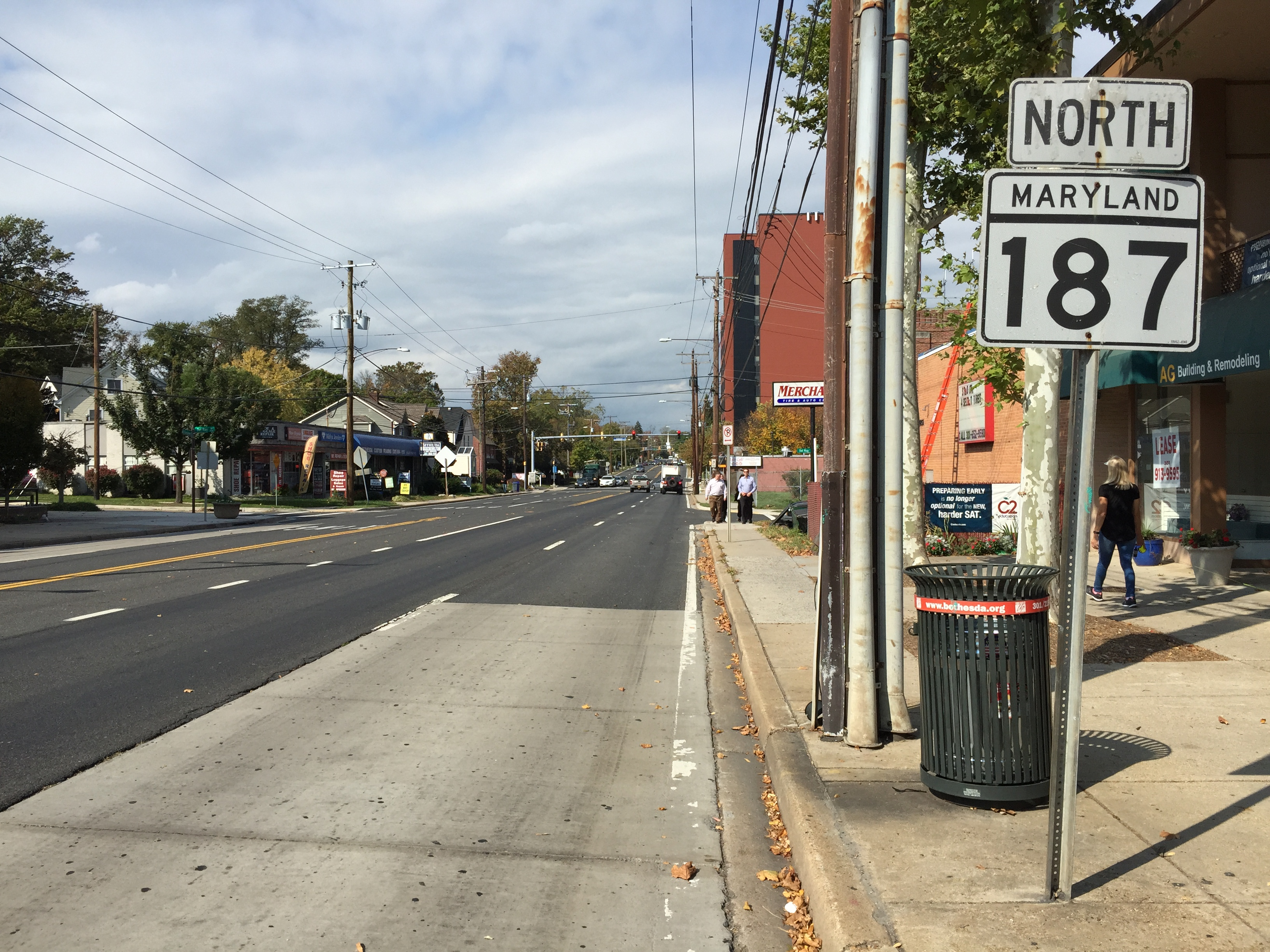
View north along MD 187 in Bethesda

MD 187 begins at an intersection with MD 355 (Wisconsin Avenue) and westbound MD 410 (East–West Highway) next to the Bethesda station along Washington Metro's Red Line in downtown Bethesda. The state highway heads northwest as a two-lane one-way street to Woodmont Avenue. Southbound MD 187 traffic is required to turn north or south onto Woodmont Avenue. Woodmont Avenue, which becomes a southbound one-way street at the intersection, leads to Montgomery Lane, which provides access to MD 355 and eastbound MD 410 (Montgomery Avenue). MD 187 heads northwest from Woodmont Avenue as a four-lane highway with a center left-turn lane that passes through a five-way intersection with the eastern terminus of MD 188 (Wilson Lane), Arlington Road, and St. Elmo Avenue and leaves downtown Bethesda. The state highway veers north and becomes a six-lane divided highway north of Huntington Parkway at Suburban Hospital, which sits opposite the southern end of the National Institutes of Health campus. MD 187 intersects several entrances to the federal campus and passes to the east of the tiny village of Oakmont at its junction with Cedar Lane.

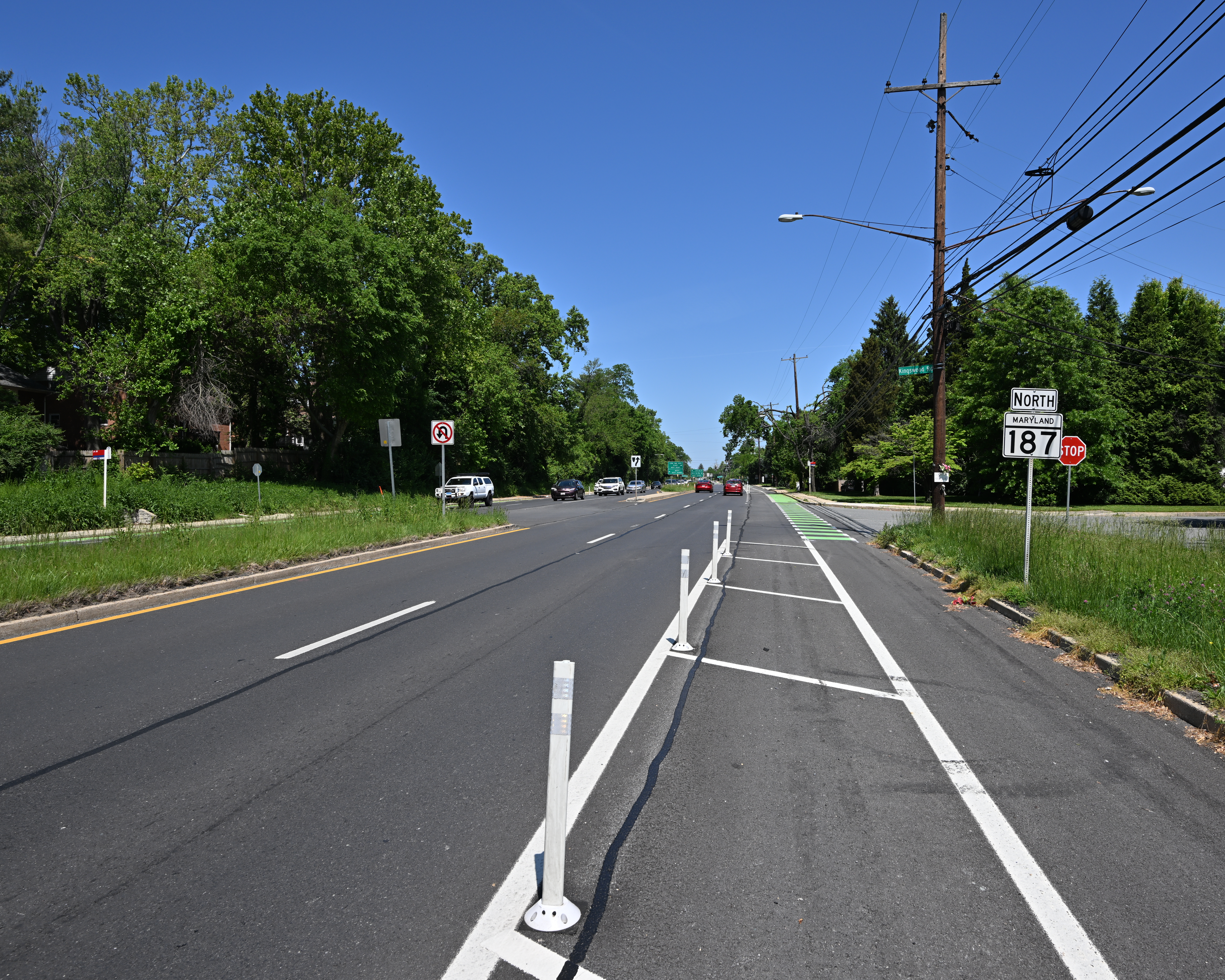
MD 187 (Old Georgetown Road) at Kingswood Road in Bethesda

MD 187 enters Rockville at its diamond interchange with I-495 (Capital Beltway). The state highway intersects Democracy Boulevard, a county highway that heads west past Walter Johnson High School and the Westfield Montgomery shopping mall. North of Democracy Boulevard, MD 187 meets I-270 (Eisenhower Memorial Highway) at an extended diamond interchange whose ramps also connect with Rockledge Boulevard. The highway intersects Tuckerman Lane north of I-270 and continues northeast toward the White Flint area of Rockville. At its intersection with Executive Boulevard, MD 187 reaches its northern terminus, with Old Georgetown Road curving to the east as a county road and heading toward an intersection with MD 355 (Rockville Pike) just north of the North Bethesda station along Washington Metro's Red Line.

MD 187 is a part of the National Highway System as a principal arterial for its entire length.

== Bicycle infrastructure ==
Bike lanes exist in both the northbound and southbound directions between Cedar Lane and Nicholson Lane. The 5-foot-wide lanes have an additional 2-foot-wide safety buffer between them and the travel lanes. These lanes were installed in 2020 between Cedar Lane and Ryland Drive, in part because of the July 2019 death of a 17-year-old boy near Beech Avenue. The bike lanes were extended in 2022 north to Nicholson Lane.

There are two Capital Bikeshare stations on Old Georgetown Road, one is at its southern terminus with MD 355 (station 32048) and the other is across from NIH at Southwick Street (station 32039).

The Bethesda Trolley Trail runs roughly parallel to Old Georgetown Road from Bethesda to White Flint. Between NIH and Charles Street the trail is co-located with the sidewalk on the east side of Old Georgetown Road.

There is a network of signed bike route to the west of Old Georgetown Road from Democracy Blvd to downtown Bethesda with multiple signed connections to Old Georgetown Road.

Bicycle Infrastructure on MD 187

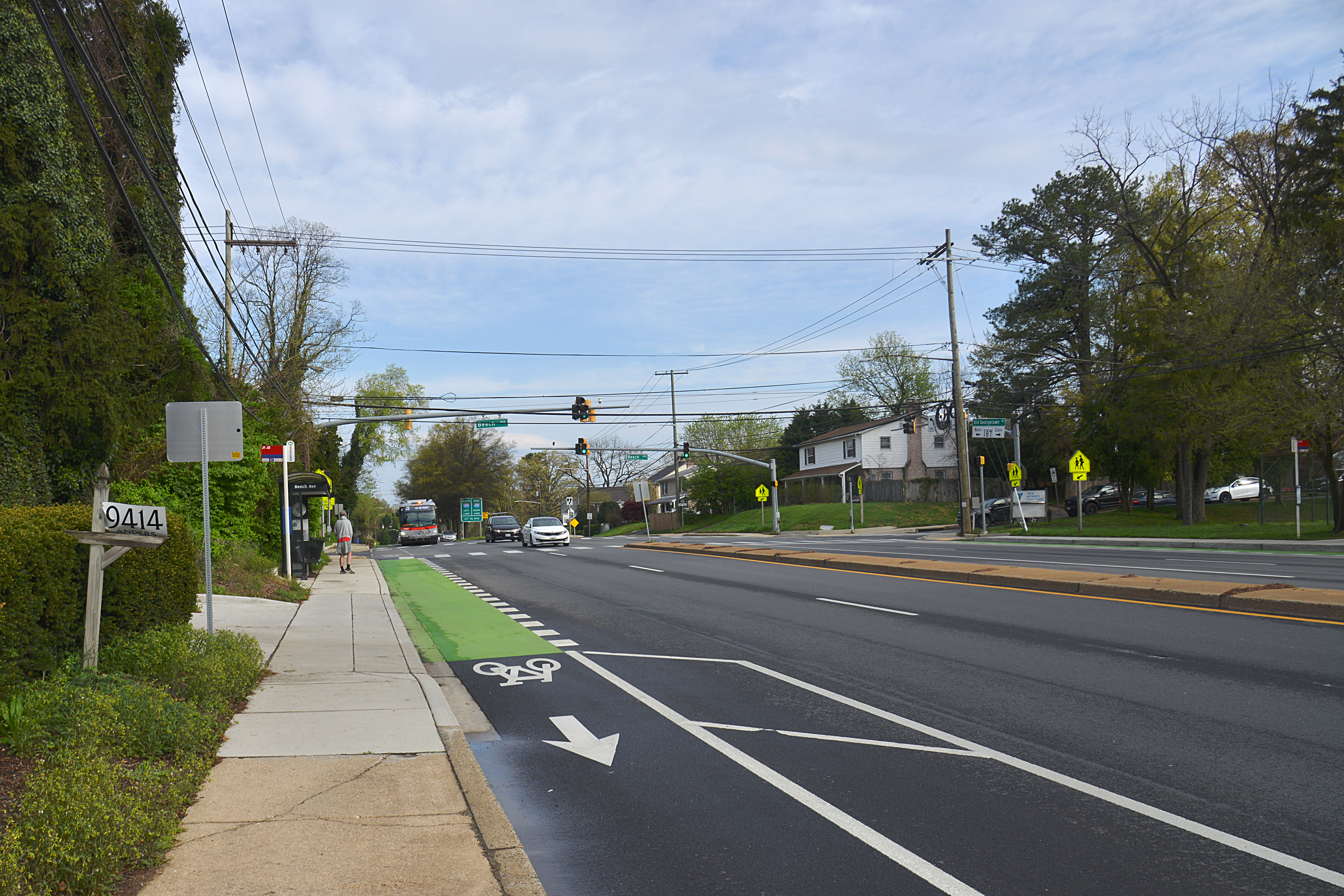
Bike lanes at Old Georgetown Road and Beech Avenue

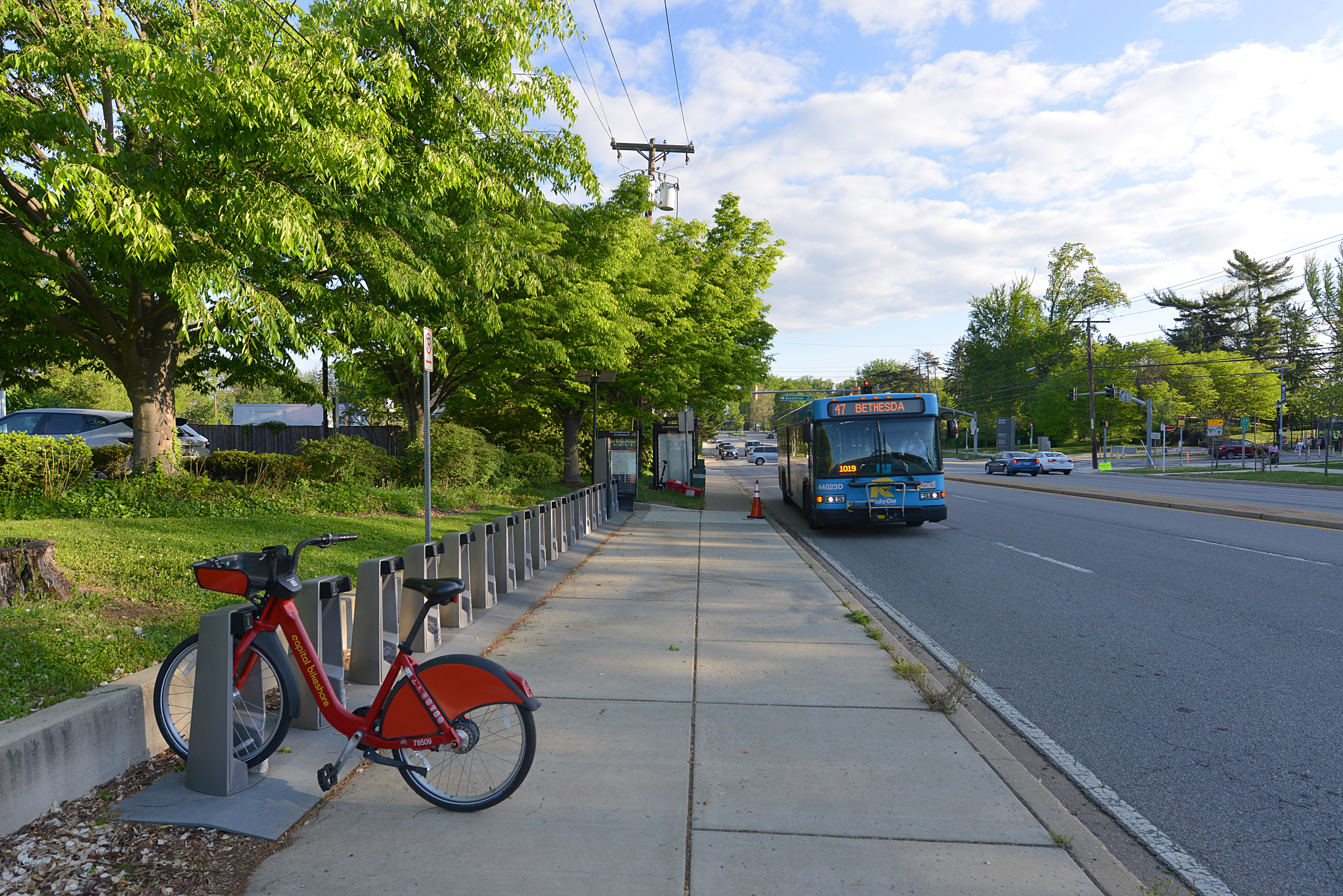
Bikeshare Station: Old Georgetown Road and Southwick Street in Bethesda

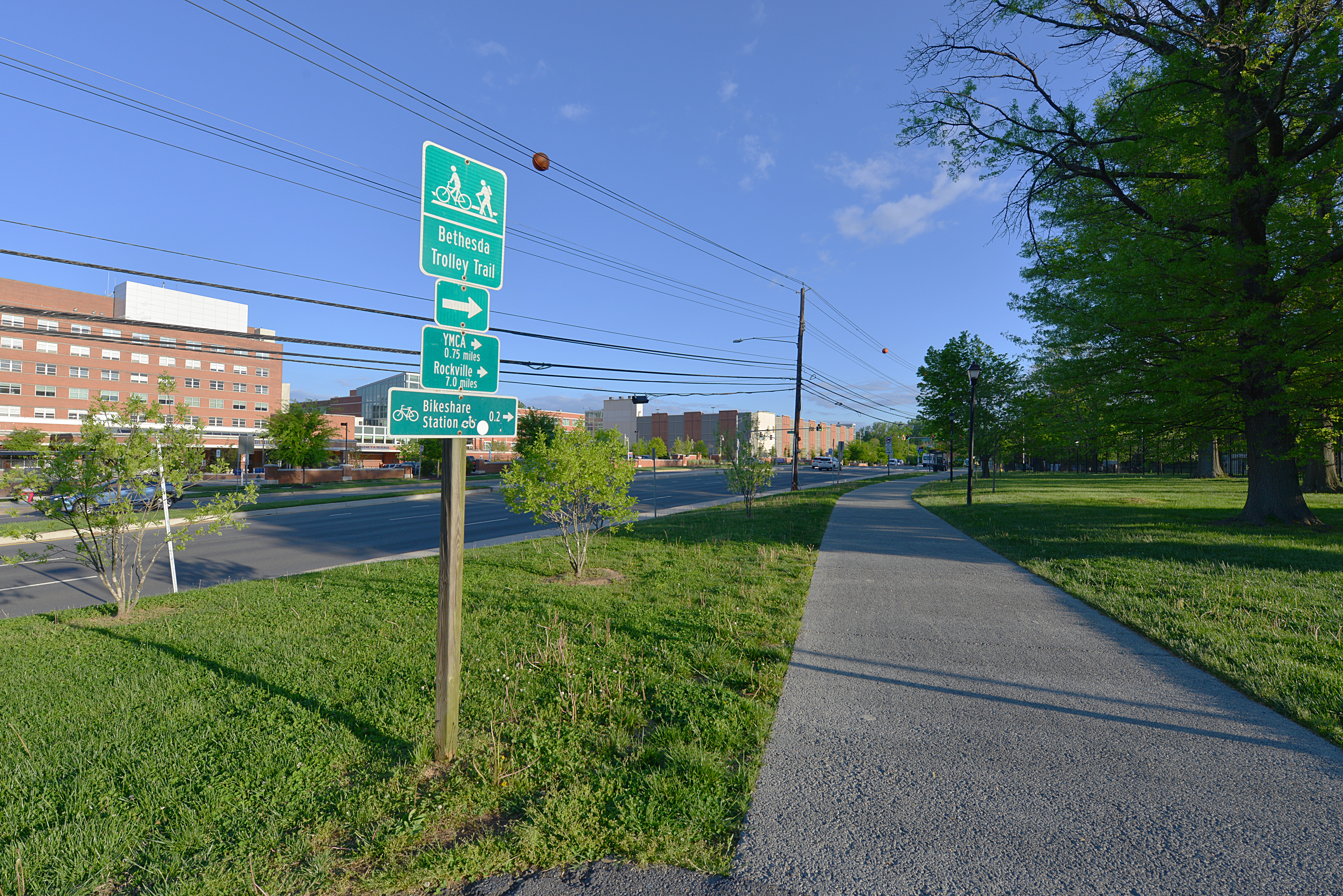
Bethesda Trolley Trail along Old Georgetown Road in Bethesda

== History ==
Old Georgetown Road is part of the original highway between Rockville and Georgetown. This course was used by portions of General Edward Braddock's army from Alexandria, Virginia, to Cumberland, Maryland, prior to the start of the ill-fated Braddock Expedition in 1755. The Rockville and Georgetown Turnpike, which opened in 1818, included a descent into the valley of Rock Creek that bypassed MD 187's portion of the Rockville–Georgetown highway. The portion of Old Georgetown Road from that turnpike (now MD 355) in Bethesda to the community of Alta Vista at Cedar Lane was paved as a macadam road by Montgomery County with state aid by 1910. MD 187 was extended to what is now Democracy Boulevard in 1924. The highway was extended as a macadam road to Tuckerman Lane in 1928. MD 187 was completed with a concrete section northeast to U.S. Route 240 (now MD 355) in 1929.

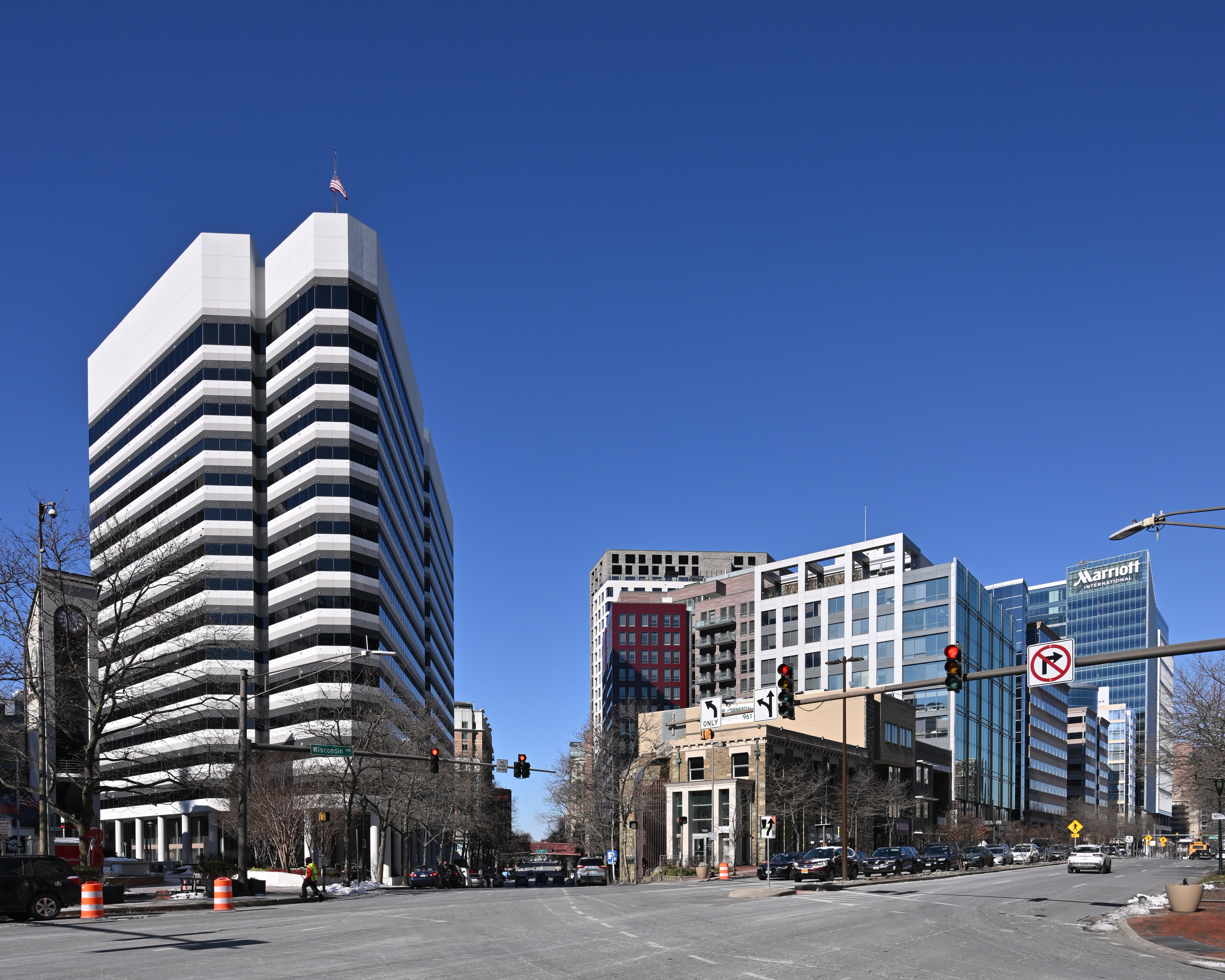
Southern terminus of Old Georgetown Road (MD-187) at Wisconsin Avenue (MD-355) in Bethesda, MD

MD 187 was widened with a pair of 3-foot-wide (0.91 m) concrete shoulders from Bethesda to Alta Vista between 1924 and 1926. That same stretch was widened with another concrete shoulder and resurfaced in 1940. MD 187 was widened a third time in downtown Bethesda with a 9-foot-wide (2.7 m) bituminous shoulder in 1948. The highway's original diamond interchange with the Washington National Pike (now I-270) was built between 1957 and 1959. MD 187 was the southern end of the freeway from then until it was extended to Rockville Pike in 1960. The highway's interchange with I-495 was completed in 1964.

MD 187 was relocated to an orthogonal intersection with MD 355 at its northern end in 1967. This replaced an acute intersection with MD 355 north of Montrose Road now named Hoya Street. The old alignment remained in the state highway system until 1987 when the part north of Montrose Road became a ramp from southbound MD 355 to Montrose Road. MD 187 was expanded to a multi-lane divided highway from MD 355 south to Alta Vista concurrent with the 1967 relocation. The divided highway was extended south to its present southern end north of Huntington Parkway in 1968. MD 187 was made one-way northbound between MD 355 and Woodmont Avenue by 1999. The highway's interchange with I-270 was reconstructed from a standard diamond to its present form with ramps to and from Rockledge Boulevard in 2002. The northern terminus of MD 187 was cut back to its current location on July 13, 2016 when the portion of Old Georgetown Road between Executive Boulevard and MD 355 was transferred to county maintenance.

== Junction list ==
The entire route is in Montgomery County.

Location	mi	km	Destinations	Notes
Bethesda	0.00	0.00	MD 355 (Wisconsin Avenue) / MD 410 east (East–West Highway)	Southern terminus; western terminus of MD 410; MD 187 begins one-way northbound
Bethesda	0.17	0.27	Woodmont Avenue to MD 355 (Wisconsin Avenue) / MD 410 east (Montgomery Avenue) – Rockville, Washington, Silver Spring	Southbound direction of MD 187 ends; southbound traffic must turn onto Woodmont Avenue
Bethesda	0.31	0.50	MD 188 west (Wilson Lane) / Arlington Road south / St. Elmo Avenue north – Glen Echo	Eastern terminus of MD 188; no direct access from eastbound MD 188 to northbound MD 187
Bethesda	2.64	4.25	I-495 (Capital Beltway) – Baltimore, Silver Spring, Northern Virginia, Fairfax	I-495 Exit 36
Rockville, Maryland	3.76	6.05	I-270 (Eisenhower Memorial Highway) to I-495 east / Rockledge Drive – Frederick, Silver Spring	I-270 Exit 1
Rockville, Maryland	5.04	8.11	Executive Boulevard / Old Georgetown Road north	Northern terminus
1.000 mi = 1.609 km; 1.000 km = 0.621 mi: Incomplete access

== Auxiliary route ==
MD 187B is the designation for the 0.08-mile (0.13 km) section of Rockledge Drive within MD 187's interchange with I-270 in Rockville. The state highway was designated in 2002 when the highway's interchange with I-270 was completed.
