= James T. Ramey =

American nuclear specialist (1914–2010)

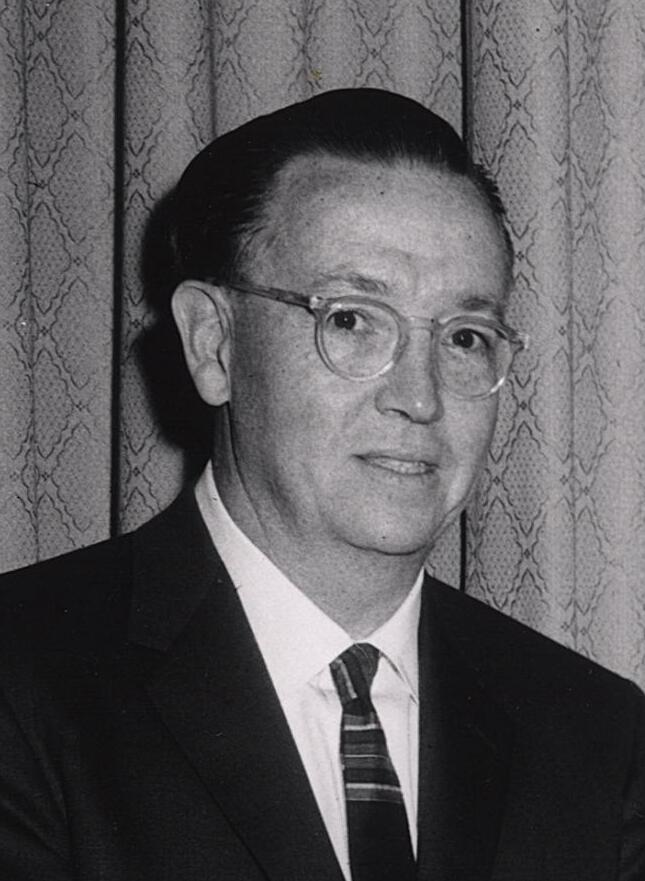
- Ramey in 1966
- Born: James Thomas Ramey; December 5, 1914; Eddyville, Kentucky, U.S.
- Died: August 28, 2010 (aged 95); Bethesda, Maryland, U.S.
- Education: Amherst College (AB); Columbia University (LLB)
- Employers: Tennessee Valley Authority; U.S. Atomic Energy Commission; Stone & Webster
- Spouse: Estelle Rosemary Rubin (m. 1941; died 2006)
- Children: 2

Member of the United States Atomic Energy Commission
- In office 31 August 1962 – June 30, 1973

James Thomas Ramey (December 5, 1914 – August 28, 2010) was an American lawyer, government official, and expert on the applications of nuclear technology. Ramey served as one of the five commissioners of the United States Atomic Energy Commission (AEC) from 1962 to 1973, the longest tenure of any AEC commissioner. He was married to the noted endocrinologist, physiologist and feminist Estelle Ramey.

== Biography ==
Ramey was born in December 1914 in Eddyville, Kentucky, U.S. but grew up in Chicago. He graduated from Amherst College in Massachusetts in 1937, before completing an LL.B. in 1941 from Columbia University in New York City. In 1938 he met Estelle Rubin, who was a doctorate student in chemistry at Columbia and in 1941 they married. They went on to have two children together. In 1941 he began working as a senior attorney for the federally owned electric utility corporation Tennessee Valley Authority (TVA) in Knoxville.

=== Atomic Energy Commission ===
In 1946 Ramey's boss David Lilienthal left the TVA to become chair of the United States Atomic Energy Commission (AEC) and in 1947 Lilienthal recruited Ramey as an assistant general counsel in the AEC's Chicago operations office. Ramey began applying his experience gained at the TVA to write a new, more flexible contract between the AEC and Westinghouse Electric Corporation who would be building a reactor for the world's first nuclear powered submarine, USS Nautilus (SSN-571). The contract became a model for subsequent AEC contracts. Ramey was later promoted to principal administrative officer of the AEC's Chicago operations office. From 1956 to 1962 he was employed as executive director of the Joint Committee on Atomic Energy (JCAE), a congressional committee which oversaw the AEC.

In 1962 the JCAE placed heavy pressure on President John F. Kennedy to appoint Ramey to one of the two vacant commissioner posts, while one commissioner threatened to resign from the AEC if Ramey was appointed.

In August 1962, Kennedy appointed Ramey to be one of the five commissioners of the Atomic Energy Commission. He was twice reappointed by President Lyndon B. Johnson in 1964 and 1968 with his final term ending in June 1973, making him the longest serving AEC commissioner. Ramey provided President Kennedy with intelligence during the 1962 Cuban Missile Crisis. Ramey used his position on the AEC to be a strong advocate for civilian nuclear applications such as nuclear power, medicine and desalination. For most of Ramey's time as commissioner the chair was the Nobel-chemist Glenn T. Seaborg, who later described Ramey as the "most difficult of the commissioners to get along with on a personal level", but stated that Ramey was "very able and intelligent" and that the two of them managed to achieve a "working relationship" when "pushing agreed-upon objectives". In 1974, Anthony Ripley of The New York Times described Ramey as "perhaps the single most influential member of the commission in the last decade".

=== Later life ===
After his AEC commissioner term came to an end in 1973, Ramey worked as a vice-president of the engineering company Stone & Webster in Massachusetts.

Ramey's wife Estelle died in 2006. Ramey died August 28, 2010, in Suburban Hospital, Bethesda, Maryland, aged 95 from complications from pneumonia. He was survived by his two children.
