= James Ramey (politician) =

American politician (1917–2015)

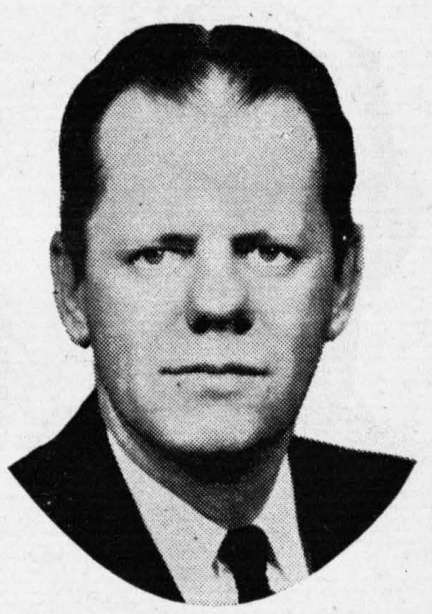

Member of the South Dakota House of Representatives from the 26th district
- In office 1955–1964

Personal details
- Born: February 12, 1917 Dowling, Haakon County, South Dakota, US
- Died: July 19, 2015 (aged 98) Phillip, South Dakota, US
- Party: Republican
- Spouse: Myrtle Olive Alden (m. 1939–2007)
- Education: Dakota Wesleyan University

James Graham Ramey (February 12, 1917 – July 19, 2015) was an American politician in the state of South Dakota who was a member of the South Dakota House of Representatives from 1955 to 1964. Ramey was an alumnus of Dakota Wesleyan University and was a cattle rancher. He was married to Myrtle Olive Alden from 1939 to her death in 2007. He died in 2015.
