= Baltimore and Ohio Railroad locomotives =

American locomotives

On the Baltimore and Ohio Railroad, locomotives were always considered of great importance, and the railroad was involved in many experiments and innovations.

== History ==
=== Early locomotives ===
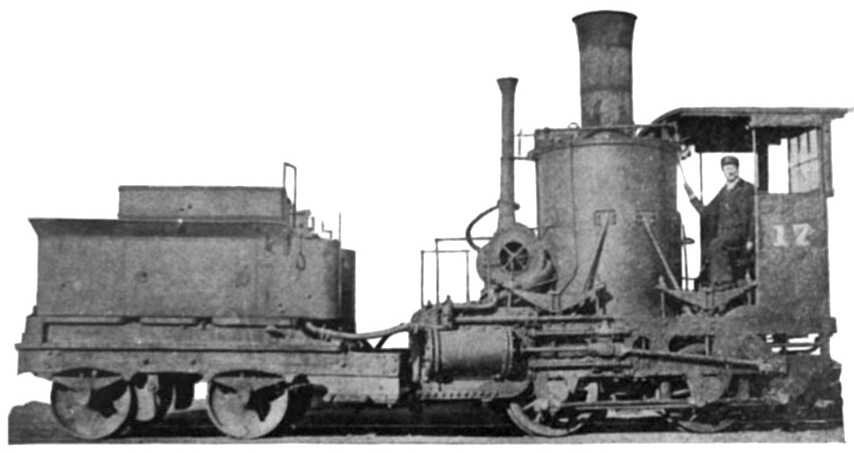
A Baltimore and Ohio Crab, the Mazeppa, built around 1837 and photographed after years of service.

The name Tom Thumb is forever associated with the B&O, as the first steam locomotive built in the United States for an American railroad. It was built strictly as a demonstrator, but it was succeeded by a series of similar locomotives (the "Grasshoppers" and the "Crabs") designed by Ross Winans, the first head of motive power on the railroad. Early B&O designs were quite unlike those used on other roads, due to in-house design and the emphasis of pulling power. 4-2-0 locomotives from Norris (represented by the "Lafayette" reproduction in the B&O museum's collection) were the anomaly on a railroad which was already building eight-coupled (0-8-0) locomotives well before the Civil War. By the beginning of the war, new power on the railroad had become more conventional, though many of the older, unconventional designs remained.

Up until 1884 locomotive numbers were reused when locomotives were retired; numbers were not allocated sequentially (unless lower numbers were used up). In 1884, in order to reduce confusion, all locomotives were renumbered to group like locomotives together, and thereafter numbers were retired along with the locomotive to which they referred.

=== The Baltimore Belt Line and electrification ===
John W. Garrett's desire to have a line to New York led to the construction of the Baltimore Belt Line in order to bring the railroad across Baltimore. The most important feature of this was the Howard Street Tunnel, which began at Camden Station and headed north to Mount Royal Station. Objections to use of steam led, in 1895, to the first main line electrification in North America. Trains in one direction were pulled through the tunnel, by a series of electric locomotives that lasted until the end of steam; in the other direction, the train simply drifted down the slope. Dieselization made the electrification unnecessary and it was discontinued in 1952.

=== "Old Maude" ===
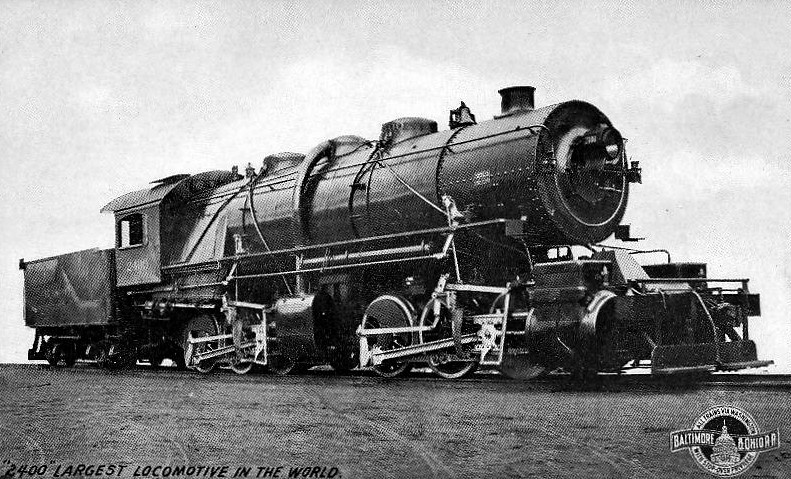
"Old Maude" from a Baltimore and Ohio postcard.

Another innovation was the introduction of Mallet locomotives. Economies in haulage could be achieved by reducing the number of locomotives and trains needed, so ever more powerful locomotives were always sought. In 1904 #2400 (renumbered #7000 in 1915), a 0-6-6-0 design, was introduced. It had a 71,500 lbf (318 kN) tractive effort and was a great success, albeit with a maximum speed of only 21 mph (34 km/h). It quickly became known as "Old Maude" after a cartoon mule due to its strength. It was the first Mallet in North America. Mallets were built in large numbers for the B&O, culminating in the huge EM-1 2-8-8-4.

=== "Uncle Dan" and Colonel Emerson ===
In the presidency of Daniel Willard, the motive power department, headed by Col. George H. Emerson, entered on a long series of experiments intended to improve the performance of the steam locomotive. Particular emphasis was placed on the water tube boiler, as opposed to the fire tube boiler used from the earliest days of steam. (In practice, only the firebox used water tubes.) The culmination of these experiments was the duplex #5600 George H. Emerson, the first of its kind. It was to be succeeded by a visionary locomotive of a unique design, of which very little was built before the whole project was cancelled.

Many other trials were conducted of steam locomotive appliances, very few of which had any lasting impact.

At the turn of the 20th century various compound locomotives were tried, particularly of the Vauclain and tandem patterns. As on other roads, they presented maintenance problems, and only the Mallets were repeated. Some engines had scoops to take on water from track pans, which were found on the line to New York.

The P-7 "president" engines were originally painted olive green, with the name of a United States president in gold on the cab; later they were painted a dark blue. Certain experimental engines had a British-style firebox door instead of the usual American Type.

=== Diesels ===
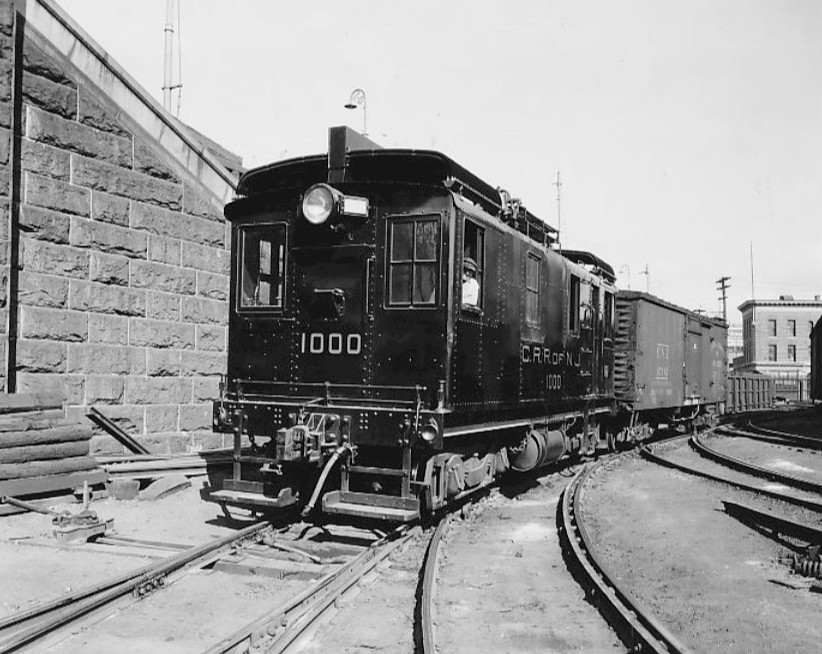
CNJ 1000 in 1957, as it was being retired from service. It is now at the National Museum of Railroad History & Innovation.

In 1925 the B&O was one of the buyers of the first model of diesel locomotive, of which CNJ 1000 was the first example. These were used as yard engines in areas where smoke abatement led to restrictions or bans on the use of steam. In 1935 a single unit mainline diesel-electric engine (#50) was constructed; this was eventually transferred to the Chicago and Alton Railroad, an affiliated line.

Finally in 1937 the B&O bought the first multiple unit diesel locomotives to power its passenger trains. And in 1937 they ran the first coast to coast use of diesel electric locomotives. The railroad put an end to the steam locomotive experiments, though wartime pressures would lead to purchase of many other new steam locomotives. Dieselization took many years, and in the meantime a long program of upgrading older locomotives was continued. The P-7 Pacifics were particularly targeted for improvements, culminating in the Cincinnatian, for which four of the engines were upgraded and streamlined to a design by Olive Dennis, who also supervised the refurbishment of the rolling stock.

The B&O did not emphasize standardization, and when road diesels were bought, they were purchased from nearly every manufacturer. By the time of the railroad's purchase in 1963, though, they were well on their way to becoming the all-EMD line which they remained to the end.

In 1954 a group of steam switchers was renumbered to free up numbers in the 600s and 700s for diesels. Then in 1956 all locomotives were renumbered again. All steam locomotives were renumbered below 1000, thus freeing all four digit numbers for use by the growing numbers of diesels.

== Locomotive classification ==
Before the Civil War, the B&O organized its locomotives into four classes, based upon relative power. After the war this was felt to be inadequate, and a classification scheme was devised, based upon wheel arrangement. Each wheel arrangement was assigned a letter, except for 4-4-0 locomotives, which were subdivided according to cylinder size. When articulated steam locomotives were first introduced, they were assigned a single class ("O"). This proved inadequate almost immediately and a two letter code was used instead, based on treating the locomotive as if it were two engines coupled back-to-back.

Within each letter class, a number was assigned for each successive design. Usually the first class was numbered "1". Locomotives acquired through mergers were renumbered and reclassified to fit into the sequences of numbers and classes.

Lowercase letter suffixes were used to denote successive modifications of a design. The "t" suffix was also used to indicate that the locomotive was assigned an extra large tender. In the 20th century, such modifications were common, and the pattern of suffixes could become confusing. At one point there was even a class "Qodd" Mikado (2-8-2).

Diesel locomotives were initially classified according to intended service and model. Eventually this was dropped in favor of using the manufacturer's model designations.

Steam classes were as follows:

- A initially 4-6-0 camelback locomotives; later 4-4-2
- B 4-6-0
- C 0-4-0
- D 0-6-0
- E 2-8-0
- F 4-4-0 with 16" dia. cylinders or less
- G 4-4-0 with 17" dia. cylinders
- H 4-4-0 with 18" dia. cylinders
- I 4-4-0 with 19" dia. cylinders
- J 4-4-0 and 4-4-4 with Wootten fireboxes
- K 2-6-0
- L 0-8-0
- M 4-4-0 with 20" dia. cylinders
- N 4-4-4-4 — One locomotive: #5600 George H. Emerson
- O originally for any Mallet type; replaced by two letter code
- P 4-6-2
- Q 2-8-2
- R 0-4-4 Forney locomotives
- S 2-10-2 – Two classes S and S-1
- T 4-8-2 - Five classes T, T-1, T-2, T-3, and T-4.
- U 0-10-0
- V 4-6-4 – Four locomotives in four classes: V-1, V-2, V-3, and V-4.
- W 4-2-2-2-2-4 geared locomotive (never built)
- Y 2-10-0

Articulated classes:

- DD 0-6-6-0
- EE 2-8-8-2
- EL 2-8-8-0
- EM 2-8-8-4
- KB 2-6-6-4
- KK 2-6-6-2
- KL 2-6-8-0
- LL 0-8-8-0
- MK 4-4-6-2

Electric locomotive classes were as follows:

- LE-1 the original B+B motors
- LE-2 B-B motors intended for freight haulage
- OE-1, OE-2, 'OE-3 B-B
- CE-1 B switcher

There was one gasoline-powered locomotive:

- CG 0-4-0

== Notable classes and locomotives ==
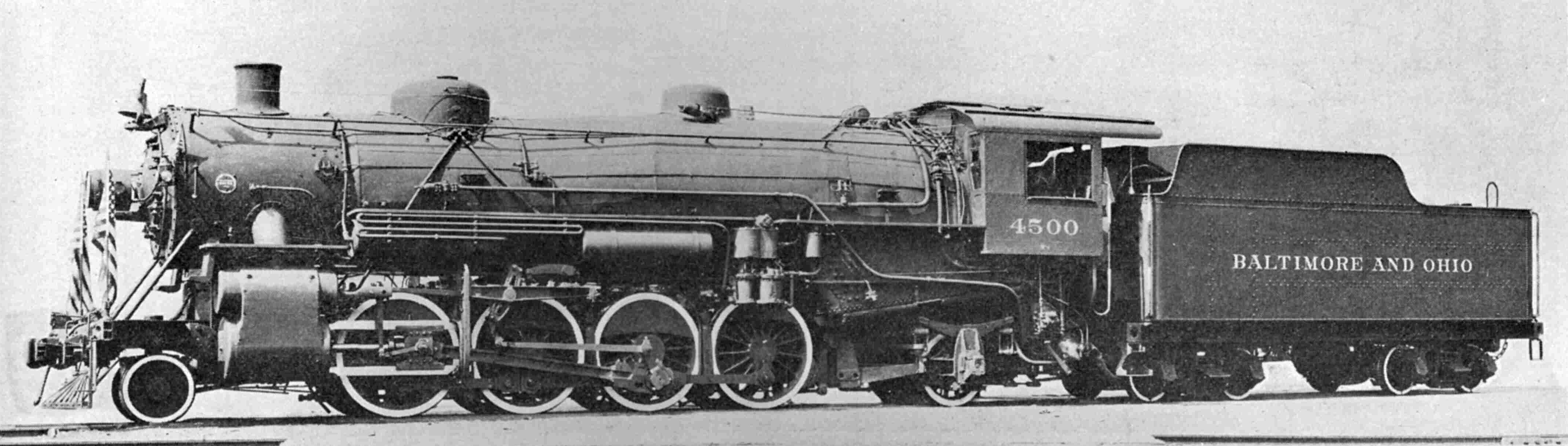
Builder's Photo of B&O #4500

- Tom Thumb was the first steam locomotive used in the United States
- 2400 Old Maude (Class DD-1) was the first Mallet in the United States
- 5600 George H. Emerson (Class N-1) was the first duplex locomotive
- Class Q-3 was the USRA Light Mikado including the very first built (#4500)
- Class P-7 was the "president" series of pacifics (4-6-2)
- Class C-16 was the "Little Joe" or "Dockside" switchers
- Class LE-1 locomotives were the first mainline electric locomotives
- The class EM-1 simple articulated locomotives were the largest locomotives run on the B&O
- William Mason is currently the oldest operating example of the 4-4-0 type locomotive in the United States.

=== Preservation ===
- 0-6-0 D-44 No. 1190. Currently on display inside the Age of Steam Roundhouse in Sugarcreek, Ohio as a reminder of the results of leaving a steam locomotive outside to deteriorate for a number of years. It was originally built by Alco's Brooks Works in 1904 as Buffalo, Rochester and Pittsburgh Railway No.152 before becoming B&O No. 390 in 1932, and then it was soon renumbered again to 1190. It was sold to the Ohio River Sand and Gravel Company for the remainder of its career before being donated to the city of New Martinsville. From 1979 to 2008, No. 1190 deteriorated in the outdoor elements at the Mad River and NKP Museum in Bellevue, Ohio. It was subsequently sold to a private owner in Dunkirk, New York, who sold it in 2014 to the AOSR.
- 2-8-0 No. 476. Currently on static display at the Oakland B&O Museum in Oakland, Maryland. (Note: This locomotive never operated for the B&O, as the Oakland Museum only repainted it to represent a typical B&O locomotive. It was initially built by Baldwin in 1920 as for the Jonesboro, Lake City and Eastern Railroad as No. 40, and in 1925, the Railroad was absorbed into the St. Louis–San Francisco Railway, and it was renumbered to 76. It spent its final years in revenue service working on branch lines for the Mississippian Railway from 1947 to 1967. It was subsequently used to pull tourist trains on the Penn View Mountain Railroad, the Blairsville and Indiana Railroad, and the Gettysburg Railroad, before it was sold in 1998 to the Ohio Central Railroad for storage. It was then sold in 2005 to the Steam Railroading Institute for a restoration that never came to full fruition, and the locomotive found its way to Oakland in 2018.)
- 2-8-2 Q-3 No. 4500. Currently on static display at the National Museum of Railroad History & Innovation in Baltimore, Maryland. Built by Baldwin in 1918, No. 4500 was the very first USRA standard 2-8-2 locomotive ever built, and it operated on the B&O's Ohio Division mainly hauling freight until it was retired from service in 1958, but not before being renumbered to 300 in order to make way for four-digit numbered diesel locomotives. In 1960, the locomotive was donated to the National Museum of Railroad History & Innovation, and it has remained on static display there since 1964.
- 4-6-2 P-7 No. 5300 President Washington. Currently awaiting a cosmetic restoration at the National Museum of Railroad History & Innovation in Baltimore, Maryland. Built by Baldwin in 1927 as the prototype locomotive of the famous P-7 class, No. 5300 served the B&O while pulling the Royal Blue train, as well as the Capitol Limited train, until it was removed from the B&O's active list in 1957, one year after being renumbered to 100. The locomotive was put on static display in its original 1927 appearance in 1968 while being put on static display at the National Museum of Railroad History & Innovation.
