= Little Joe =

Little Joe may refer to:

== People ==
- Little Joe McLerran (born 1983), American singer, guitarist and recording artist
- Joe Arenas (1925–2020), American retired National Football League player
- Little Joe Blue (1934–1990), American blues singer and guitarist, born Joseph Valery Jr.
- Little Joe Cook (1922–2014), American R&B singer and songwriter
- Joe Dallesandro (born 1948), American actor and counterculture icon, associated with Andy Warhol and Lou Reed
- Joseph DeFede (1934–2012), New York City mob boss turned informant
- Joe Hamilton (basketball) (born 1948), American retired basketball player
- "Little Joe" Hupp, a member of the 1960s rock band The Smoke Ring
- Joe Morgan (1943–2020), American Major League Baseball player
- Joe Pavelski (born 1984), American National Hockey League player
- Joe Presko (1928–2019), American retired Major League Baseball pitcher
- Joe Washington (born 1953), American retired National Football League player
- Joe Weatherly (1922–1964), American stock car racing driver
- Joseph Wentworth, early 20th century American college football player and coach
- Joe Yeager (1875–1937), American Major League Baseball player
- Ring name of Joe Acton (1852–1917), British professional wrestler and world champion
- Little Joe (singer) (born 1940), stage name of American tejano performer José María De León Hernández
- Ranking Joe (born 1959), also known as Little Joe, Jamaican reggae DJ Joseph Jackson
- J.O.E. (1986–2011), Jamaican reggae singer formerly known as 'Lil Joe' or 'Little Joe'
- Little Papa Joe (1935–2018), American blues guitarist and singer
- Little Son Joe (1900–1961), American blues guitarist and composer

== Arts and entertainment ==
=== Fictional characters ===
- Little Joe (character), Joseph, the youngest Cartwright son in the television series Bonanza
- Little Joe (Veggietales), a Veggietales character
- Little Joe Jackson, the protagonist of the 1940 Broadway musical Cabin in the Sky and the 1943 film Cabin in the Sky
- Little Joe, in Team Umizoomi
- A character in the 1970 film Kelly's Heroes
- The title character of "Little Joe the Wrangler", an American cowboy song

=== Other arts and entertainment ===
- Little Joe (comic strip), a Western comic strip created in the early 1930s by Ed Leffingwell
- Little Joe (film), a 2019 British-Austrian drama film
- "Little Joe", a track from the album Screaming Life by Soundgarden

== Places ==
- Mount Little Joe, Victoria, Australia - see Warburton, Victoria
- Little Joe River, Minnesota

== Rockets and missiles ==
- KAN Little Joe, a US Navy surface-to-air missile
- Little Joe (rocket), a 1959 booster rocket used in the US Mercury space program
- Little Joe II, used in the US Apollo space program

== Locomotives ==
- Little Joe (Baltimore and Ohio locomotive), the last 0-4-0 steam locomotives built for the Baltimore and Ohio Railroad
- Little Joe (electric locomotive), a type of railroad electric locomotive

== Other uses ==
- Nickname for four in a game of craps
- Little Joe's, a former Italian restaurant (1928–1998) in Los Angeles, California
