= Alty =

Surname with notable individuals in science and academia

Alty is a given name and surname. Notable people with the name include:

- James Alty (1939–2022), British computer scientist
- Rebecca Alty, Canadian politician in Northwest Territories
- Thomas Alty (1899–1982), Scottish physicist and university administrator
- Alty Karliev, Soviet and Turkmen actor, director and dramatist
- Alty McKenzie, Jamaican footballer
- Alty George Nunes III, known as J.O.E. or Lil Joe, Jamaican reggae singer

== See also ==
- Ally (name)
- Alti
- Altrincham
