= Grasshopper beam engine =

Beam engines that are pivoted at one end, rather than in the centre

Animation for Grasshopper Linkage. Dimensions: Cyan Link = a Yellow Link = 2a Green Link = b Vertical Distance between Ground Joints ≈ 2a Horizontal Distance between Ground Joints ≈ b

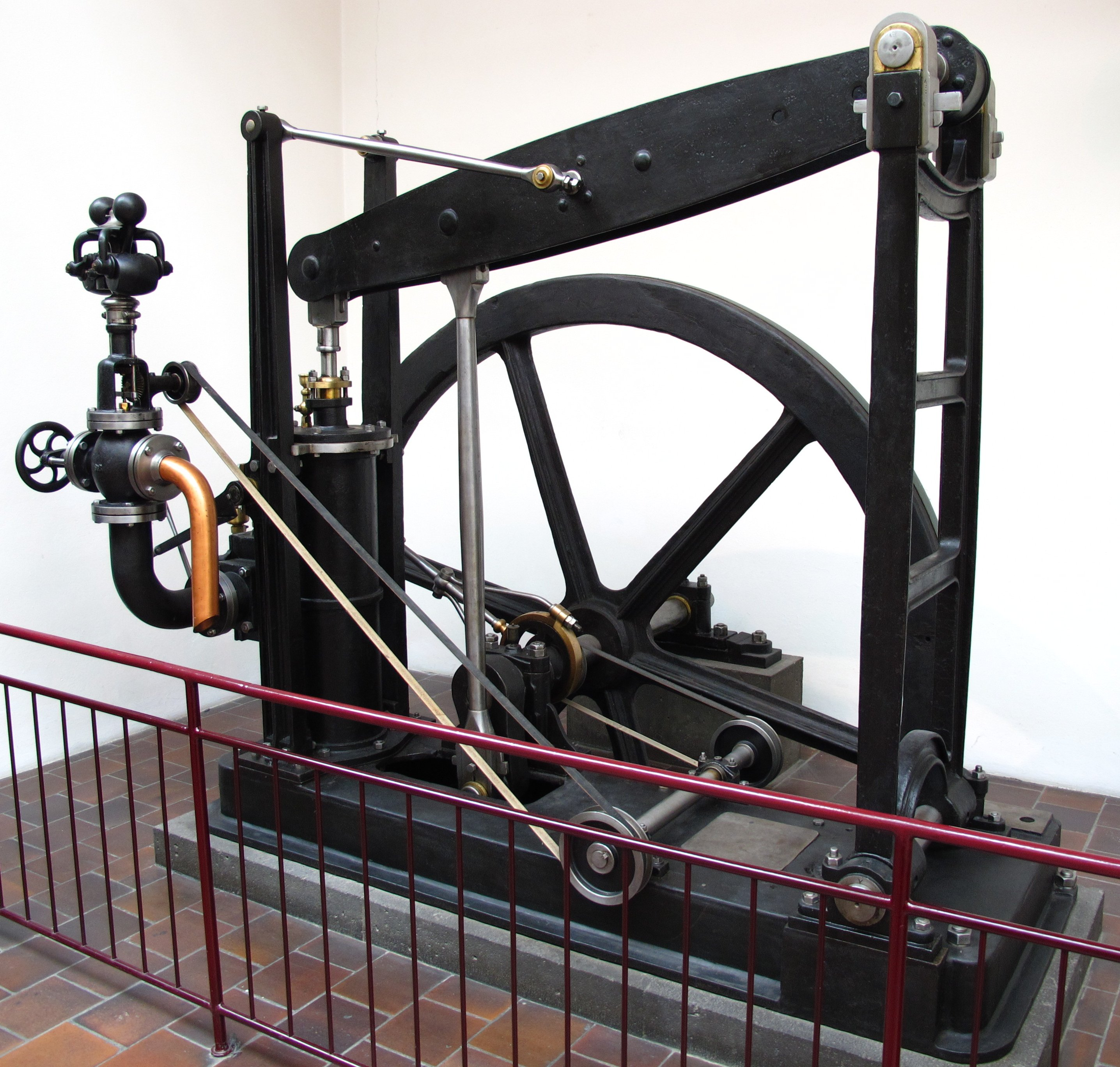
German stationary engine of 1847

Grasshopper beam engines are beam engines that are pivoted at one end, rather than in the centre.

Usually the connecting rod to the crankshaft is placed between the piston and the beam's pivot. That is, they use a second-class lever, rather than the usual first-class lever.

== Origins ==
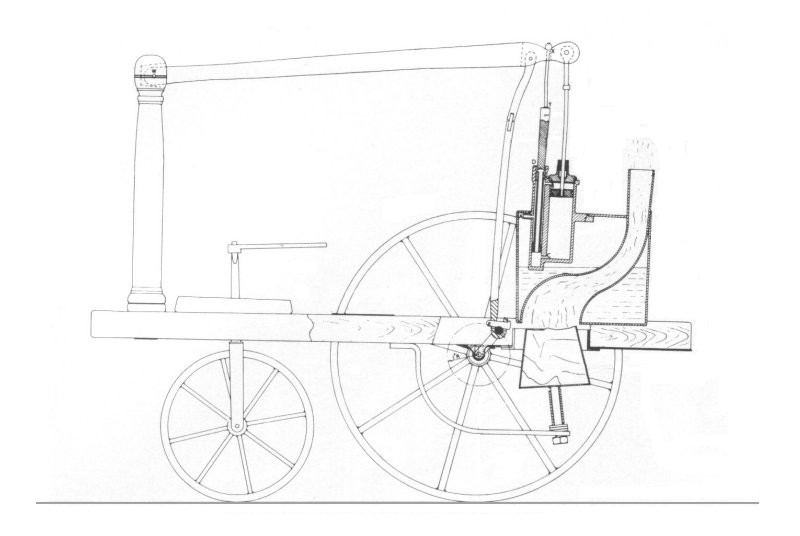
William Murdoch's model steam carriage of 1784

The first recorded example of a grasshopper beam was William Murdoch's model steam carriage of 1784. The beam offered negligible mechanical advantage and appears to have been used primarily instead of a crosshead, for what was effectively a return connecting rod engine. The American engineer Oliver Evans drew a high-pressure marine grasshopper engine in 1801, (Note: A concept similar to Trevithick's high-pressure locomotive of the same period.) and in 1805 built the Oruktor Amphibolos, an amphibious dredger.

Almost all grasshopper engines placed the crankshaft between the piston and the beam's pivot. This allows a long stroke for the piston, with a shorter stroke for the crank, although with greater force. This was advantageous for early low-pressure steam engines (Note: Although these were termed 'high-pressure' engines in their day, by comparison to the earlier atmospheric engines, these low pressures would soon be superseded following the development of the cylindrical flued boiler.) that had limited cylinder force but could increase their power by using a longer cylinder. A few exceptions, those of the Americans Oliver Evans' boats and Phineas Davis' Grasshopper locomotives, reversed this and placed the cylinder in between the pivot and crank: a third-class lever.

Many grasshopper engines were built as stationary engines. A few notable early steam locomotives used beam engines, all of which were of the grasshopper pattern. Rather more grasshopper engines were built as marine engines.

== Marine engines ==
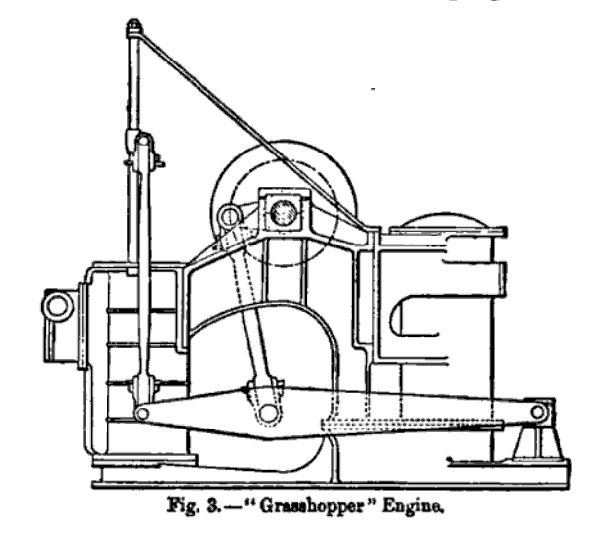
Marine grasshopper engine

One of the most important uses for the grasshopper engine was as a marine engine for paddle steamers. After Evans' unsuccessful experiments with the Oruktor Amphibolos, the first successful grasshopper engine was that of the first commercially successful steamboat, the PS Comet of 1812. In marine use, the grasshopper engine was termed the 'half-lever' engine (Note: The marine analogue of the beam engine being termed the 'lever engine') and used a pair of low-set levers, one each side of the cylinder. This gave a low centre of gravity for stability and a high crankshaft, suitable for driving paddlewheels. Comet's engine's designer, Henry Bell, had established a pattern for an engine that would be widely used for paddle steamers over the next half-century.

== Stationary engines ==
Unlike the heavy masonry engine house used to support the beam and pivot of a conventional beam engine, the grasshopper beam was pivoted on a swinging link. The crankpin was carried directly by the beam and moved in a straight line vertically, the beam pivot moving slightly sideways on its link to allow this. (Note: As the crankpin moves in an arc relative to the beam pivot, their horizontal spacing inevitably changes. In the Watt engine, the parallelt link motion allows for this, permitting the cylinder and beam pivot to remain in place. In the grasshopper, the swinging link allows the beam to move slightly about a cylinder and crankpin that remain in the same vertical plane.) This simplified the need for a parallel motion linkage on the piston rod. Grasshopper engines were thus lighter than conventional beam engines and could be built completely in factories, rather than requiring considerable erection work to be carried out on-site. This encouraged the use of grasshopper engines for smaller sized engines. Some makers, notably Easton & Amos of Southwark, specialised in such engines. Many were used for pumping, but not for powering large mills.

=== Surviving stationary engines ===
Video of a grasshopper engine in action at the Museum of Science and Industry in Manchester

- Stephenson (1823) Birmingham Museum
- Morland Brewery, Reading (c. 1830) Abingdon, private collection
- Plessey Mill, Northumberland (c. 1830)
- Pair of engines by Easton & Amos (1854) Lound pumping station, Suffolk
- Easton & Amos (1856) Wrotham Park, Barnet
- Easton & Amos (1861) Royal Horticultural Society, Wisley, later the Royal Albert Hall. Now at the Science Museum
- Haywards Heath (1865) Royal Scottish Museum, Edinburgh
- The 'Giant Grasshopper', Shore Road Pumping Station (1884)

== Grasshopper steam locomotives ==
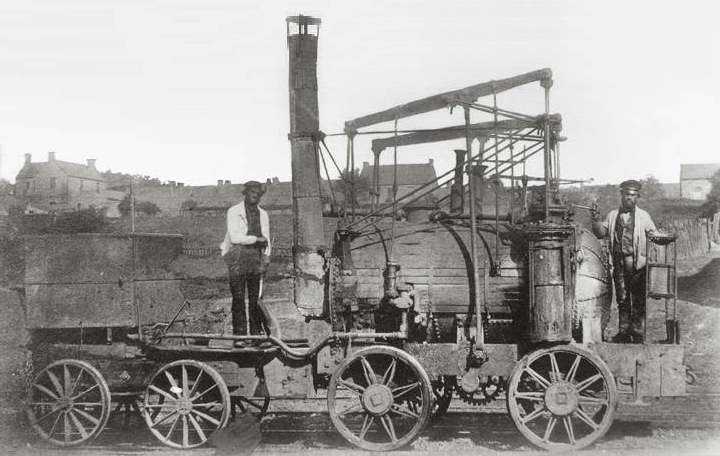
Puffing Billy

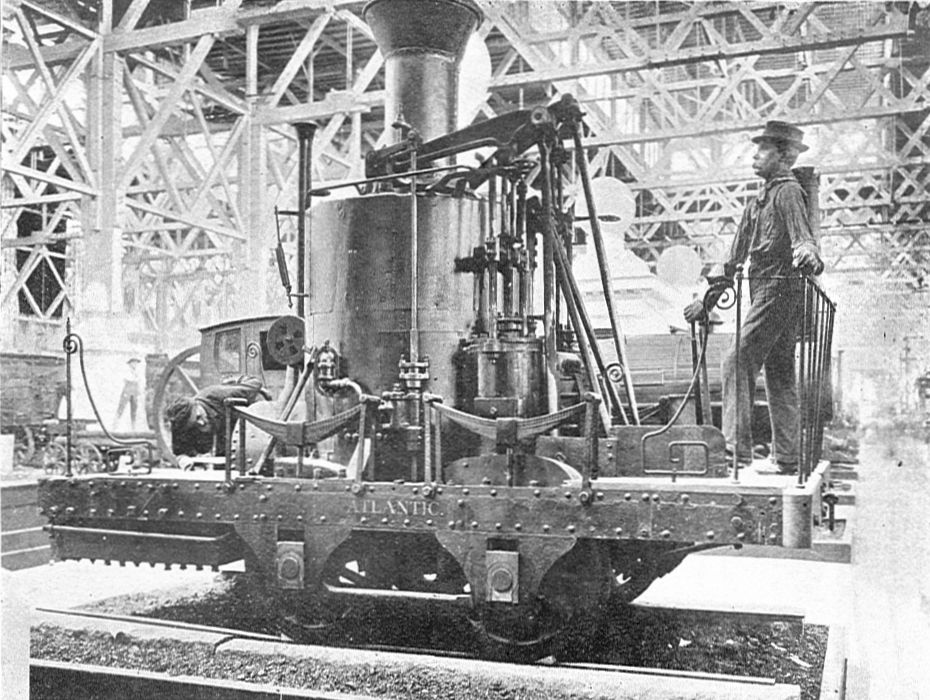
Baltimore & Ohio grasshopper Atlantic

- Puffing Billy / Wylam Dilly (1813–1815)
- Stourbridge Lion / Agenoria (1828)
- Baltimore & Ohio grasshopper locomotives (1832)
