= Baltimore and Ohio 5300 =

Preserved B&O P-7 class 4-6-2 locomotive

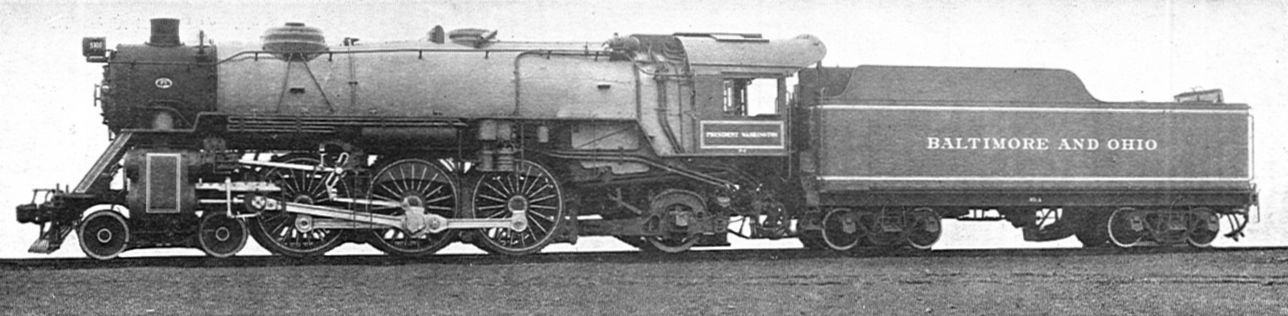
- No. 5300 shortly after it was first built, 1927
Type and origin
- Power type: Steam
- Builder: Baldwin Locomotive Works
- Serial number: 59881
- Build date: February 1927
Specifications
- Configuration
  - Whyte: 4-6-2
  - UIC: 2'C1' h2
- Gauge: 4 ft 8 1/2 in (1,435 mm)
- Driver dia.: 80 in (2,000 mm)
- Wheelbase: 72.50 ft (22.10 m)
  - Engine: 37.08 ft (11.30 m)
  - Drivers: 14 ft (4.3 m)
- Axle load: 68,000 lb (31,000 kg)
- Adhesive weight: 201,000 lb (91,000 kg)
- Loco weight: 326,000 lb (148,000 kg)
- Tender weight: 218,000 lb (99,000 kg)
- Total weight: 540,000 lb (240,000 kg)
- Fuel type: Coal
- Fuel capacity: 17.50 t (17.22 long tons; 19.29 short tons)
- Water cap.: 11,000 US gal (42,000 L; 9,200 imp gal)
- Firebox
  - Grate area: 70.30 sq ft (6.531 m^{2})
- Boiler: 90 in (2,300 mm)
- Boiler pressure: 230 psi (1,600 kPa)
- Heating surface
  - Firebox: 390 sq ft (36 m^{2})
- Cylinders: Two, outside
- Cylinder size: 27 in × 28 in (690 mm × 710 mm)
- Valve gear: Walschaerts
- Loco brake: Westinghouse air brake
Performance figures
- Maximum speed: 85 mph (137 km/h)
- Tractive effort: 49,882 lb (22,626 kg)
- Factor of adh.: 4.03
Career
- Operators: Baltimore and Ohio Railroad
- Class: P-7
- Numbers: B&O 5300; B&O 100
- Official name: President Washington
- First run: 1927
- Last run: 1957
- Retired: 1957
- Current owner: National Museum of Railroad History & Innovation
- Disposition: Undergoing cosmetic restoration

Baltimore and Ohio No. 5300, also known as President Washington Locomotive, is the sole survivor of the P-7 class 4-6-2 "Pacific" type steam locomotives. It was built by Baldwin in 1927, and it was used on mainline passenger trains across the Baltimore and Ohio system, particularly the Royal Blue train, until it was retired in 1957. After being stored for a few years, it was donated to the Baltimore and Ohio Railroad Museum in Baltimore, Maryland, where it has spent several years on static display. The locomotive is undergoing a cosmetic restoration, as of 2026.

== History ==
=== Original service life ===
Between 1906 and 1928, the Baltimore and Ohio Railroad, the first Class 1 railroad to be incorporated in the United States, ordered over 200 P class 4-6-2 "Pacific" type steam locomotives from the Baldwin Locomotive Works of Philadelphia, Pennsylvania primarily to be used in passenger trains. The final production class of 4-6-2 locomotives was the P-7 class, of which twenty were built and delivered by Baldwin in 1927, being numbered 5300–5319. This class of olive green, gold, and maroon locomotives was officially named the "President class", since all twenty of the locomotives were named after the first twenty Presidents of the United States, and No. 5300 was named after George Washington.

Shortly after No. 5300 was completed in February 1927, it was coupled to the Capitol Limited train to take part in the Fair of the Iron Horse, a celebration of the centenary of the B&O, alongside several other B&O steam locomotives. After the fair ended, No. 5300 was in service pulling the Royal Blue passenger train between Washington, D.C. and New York City, as well as the Capitol Limited between New York City and Chicago, Illinois. Just as others were in the P-7 class, 5300's tender was equipped with a water scoop which made the need for water stops along the way, rare. This allowed for refilling while travelling over track pans along the Royal Blue route. In 1944, No. 5300 was rebuilt with a semi-streamlined tender, and its original olive green livery was replaced with the B&O's standard solid blue livery with its name subsequently being removed from the cab. The locomotive also gained a modern twin-sealed beam headlight in 1951.

As the B&O began purchasing diesel locomotives, a lot of the P class 4-6-2s were removed from the active roster, and those that were left were reassigned to secondary passenger service in Pennsylvania and Ohio. By 1956, No. 5300 was among only fifty-three P class 4-6-2s left on the roster, and with the 5000 series given to locomotives from EMD, No. 5300 was renumbered 100, and the rest of the active 4-6-2s were renumbered 101–152. The following year, President Washington completed its last revenue freight assignment before it was indefinitely retired from the roster, completing 30 years of revenue service, and it was sidelined for storage.

=== Preservation ===
The locomotive was purchased along with 2-8-2 300 for safekeeping and donation by Ed Striegel of Striegel Supply & Equipment Corp., a business on Chemical Road in Curtis Bay, Maryland. Mr. Striegel bought railroad equipment for parting out and future sales to other railroads, this though was not the case for the steam locomotives on the property. Upon Mr. Striegel's death, the Baltimore Sun wrote, "In the 1950s, while visiting a storage lot for decommissioned B&O steam engines, Mr. Striegel discovered two historically significant locomotives – the President Washington, No. 100, the high-wheeling Pacific Class that had pulled such classic trains as the Capitol Limited, and a Q-3 class 2-8-2 Mikado type locomotive that had been built in 1918. He salvaged them and donated them to the B&O Railroad Museum. 'They are the linchpins of our collection,' said Courtney B. Wilson, executive director of the museum. 'Ed saved two significant pieces for the museum and, without his help, they would have been lost forever,' he said. 'In my opinion, he was a phenomenal Baltimorean. He was a quiet, unassuming and a very generous guy. The museum was his favorite place to come and he was always looking for ways to improve and enhance its collections,' Mr. Wilson said.

When the museum received No. 5300, it was then repainted in its original 1927 appearance which included: renumbering to 5300 from No.100, the dual-beam headlight swapped for a single beam Pyle National headlight, and the engine was repainted to the original B&O olive green and gold scheme with the Presidential series name, The President Washington, onto the cab. However, since the original B&O herald smokebox plate was not with the engine when it left service. The smokebox number plate, while historically accurate, but not part of the locomotive's as-built appearance, remained on the smokebox door. The locomotive also received another cosmetic repaint in 1981. The tender remains much as it was in service in the 50's.

No. 5300 was initially put on static display at the museum in November 1968, and it subsequently spent the next thirty-seven years sitting outdoors alongside other locomotives, including No. 4500 (which was renumbered to its original number from late steam era numbering, 300), EMC EA No. 51, Chesapeake and Ohio 4-6-4 No. 490, and Reading 4-8-4 No. 2101. While being displayed outdoors, the locomotive would remain exposed to the elements and would cosmetically deteriorate. In 2006, No. 5300 was put inside one of the museum's buildings to remain out of the elements and received a fresh cosmetic finish to it's paint, retaining the original olive green color. During the winter seasons, the locomotive has been temporarily be re-lettered The Polar Express, to promote the museum's Polar Express-themed excursion trains. On August 28, 2021, No. 5300 was removed from static display and towed to the museum's locomotive shop for cosmetic restoration. The restoration will take place over several years, being completed in February 2027.

== Historical significance ==
No. 5300 is the sole survivor and the prototype of the P-7 class, and it is the last out of over 200 4-6-2 "Pacifics" ever built for the Baltimore and Ohio left to survive the scrapper's torch.

No. 5300 is also one of only three B&O steam locomotives left that were built within the 20th century. The only other two are 2-8-2 No. 4500, which is also preserved at the National Museum of Railroad History & Innovation, and 0-6-0 No. 1190, which is preserved at the Age of Steam Roundhouse in Sugarcreek, Ohio.

== See also ==
- Baltimore and Ohio 4500
- William Mason (locomotive)
- Tom Thumb (locomotive)
- Atlantic (locomotive)
- Chesapeake and Ohio 1309
- Chesapeake and Ohio 614
- Reading 2101
