= Phineas Davis =

American clockmaker and inventor (1792–1835)

Phineas Davis (January 27, 1792 – September 27, 1835) was a well-known clockmaker and inventor who designed and built the first practical American coal-burning railroad locomotive.

== Early life and career ==
Davis was born in Warner, New Hampshire. He lived in York, Pennsylvania from 1809 to 1833, where he gained a national reputation as a jeweler, watchmaker and clockmaker. With his partner Jonathan Jessop, Davis invested in an iron foundry in York. This facility constructed the Codorus, the first iron steamboat made in America. The Codorus, designed by John Elgar, was launched at present-day Accomac (2 miles (3.2 km) north of Wrights Ferry, now Wrightsville) on the Susquehanna River on November 22, 1825.

== Locomotive development ==
On August 28, 1830, New York inventor Peter Cooper had publicly demonstrated his diminutive locomotive, later known as Tom Thumb. It successfully hauled 15 short tons (14,000 kg) at 4 miles per hour (6.4 km/h), and without a load reached speeds in excess of 15 miles per hour (24 km/h). The fledgling Baltimore and Ohio Railroad (B&O) was impressed with Cooper's early success, but instead of immediately offering him their business for locomotives, the company planned an open competition with a prize of $4,000. Five prototype locomotives were entered into the contest in early 1831, although Cooper did not participate. Phineas Davis's design, York, was chosen as the winner. It was a four-wheeled, vertical boiler locomotive that was somewhat similar to Cooper's design, but featured two vertical cylinders that drove vertical main rods. These in turn connected to horizontal side rods that powered the wheels. The first locomotive to burn coal, York was also the first with coupled wheels and a double instead of a single pair of drivers. It weighed 3.5 short tons (3,200 kg) and attained velocity by gearing, using a spur wheel and pinion on one of the axles of the wheels. Davis' upright "cheese boiler" consisted of a water jacket surrounding a central furnace, and a shallow drum suspended above the grates. The drum, when viewed through the fire door, was thought to resemble a cheese, thus giving the entire assembly its name.

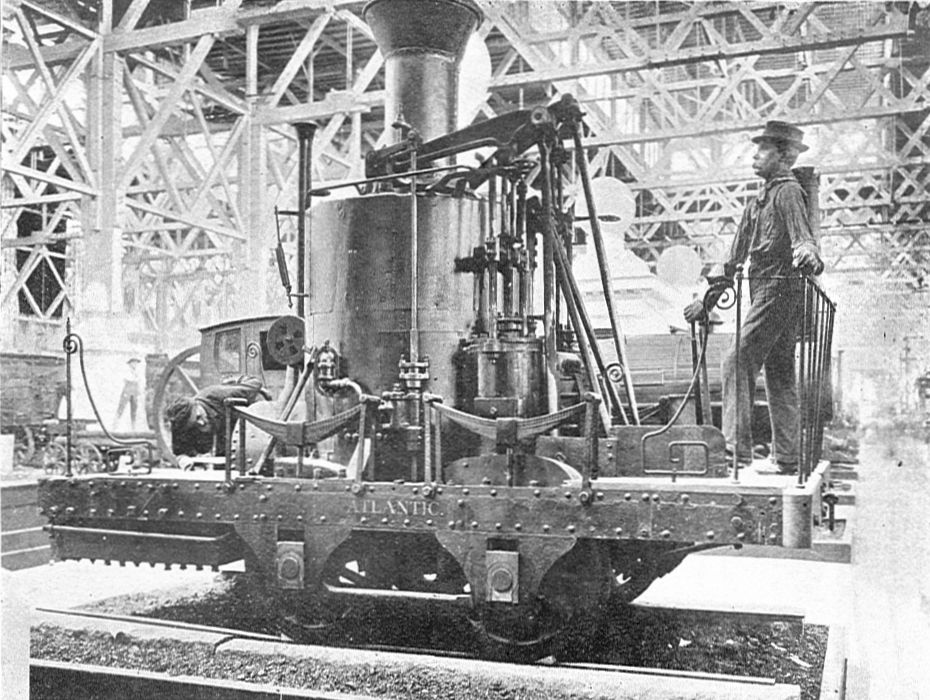
Baltimore & Ohio "Grasshopper" type locomotive, Atlantic

In September 1831, Cooper proposed building six locomotives based upon his own design for the B&O. The railroad agreed to his proposal, but when he failed to deliver on schedule, Cooper sold his patent to the B&O. Davis soon incorporated some of Cooper's ideas into an improvement on his York design. Aided by Ross Winans, Davis in 1832 constructed a second locomotive that proved to be far more commercially successful than his first. This was the Atlantic, which employed Cooper's vertical firetube boiler. Built at a cost of $4,500, Atlantic weighed 6.5 short tons (5,900 kg) and had two vertical cylinders. Ox teams were used to convey the engine to Baltimore, where it made a successful inaugural trip to Ellicott's Mills, Maryland, a distance of thirteen miles. Nicknamed Grasshopper for its distinctive vertical pushrods, the locomotive carried 50 pounds of steam (3.45 bar) and burned a ton of anthracite coal on a 40 miles (64 km) trip from Baltimore. Davis's 0-4-0 design proved reasonably successful, and 20 such locomotives were constructed at the B&O's Mount Clare Shops. Some operated for more than 60 years, and were finally retired in the 1890s. One was prominently exhibited at the New York World's Fair in 1939.

== Death and legacy ==
Phineas Davis was killed on September 27, 1835 while riding with his staff on B&O's recently completed Washington Branch. The Grasshopper derailed on the new line, due to defective track.

Phineas' partner, Ross Winans, went on to develop several lines of locomotives incorporating both Davis' and Cooper's designs.

Members of the Engineering Society of York sponsored a pair of memorials to Davis in 1924. An elementary school in York is named for the inventor. In 1949 a commemorative tablet was installed at the site of Davis's early shop at the northwest corner of King and Newberry streets in York.
