= Relay, Maryland =

Former town in Maryland

Coordinates: 39.223940°N 76.710749°W

Relay, Maryland, or Relay House, Maryland, was an important junction and rail stop on the Baltimore and Ohio Railroad, located 9 miles (14 km) west of Baltimore, Maryland. It was the busiest station on the rail line except for Baltimore itself. A town grew around it: with a general store, a school, and a volunteer fire company. Currently, Relay is a historic district of Halethorpe, Maryland, with attractions like the Thomas Viaduct and the Patapsco Valley State Park.

== The Relay House Station ==
=== Relay House ===
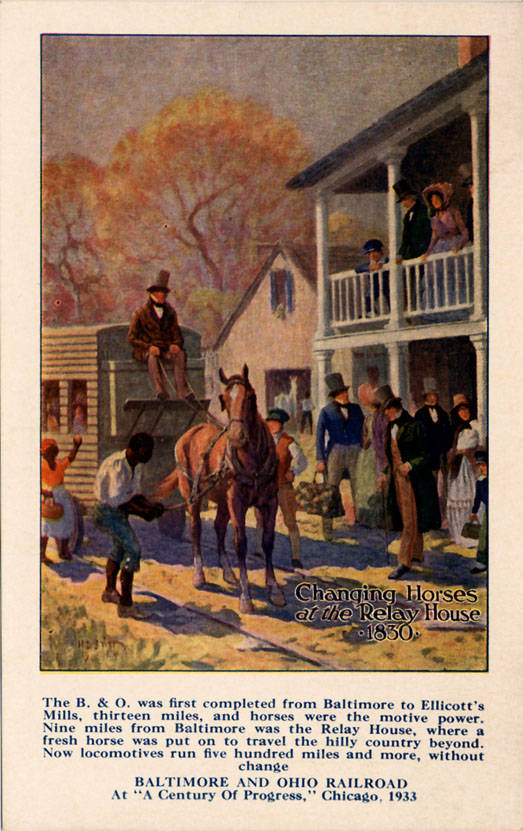
"Changing Horses At The Relay House, 1830". Artist unknown.

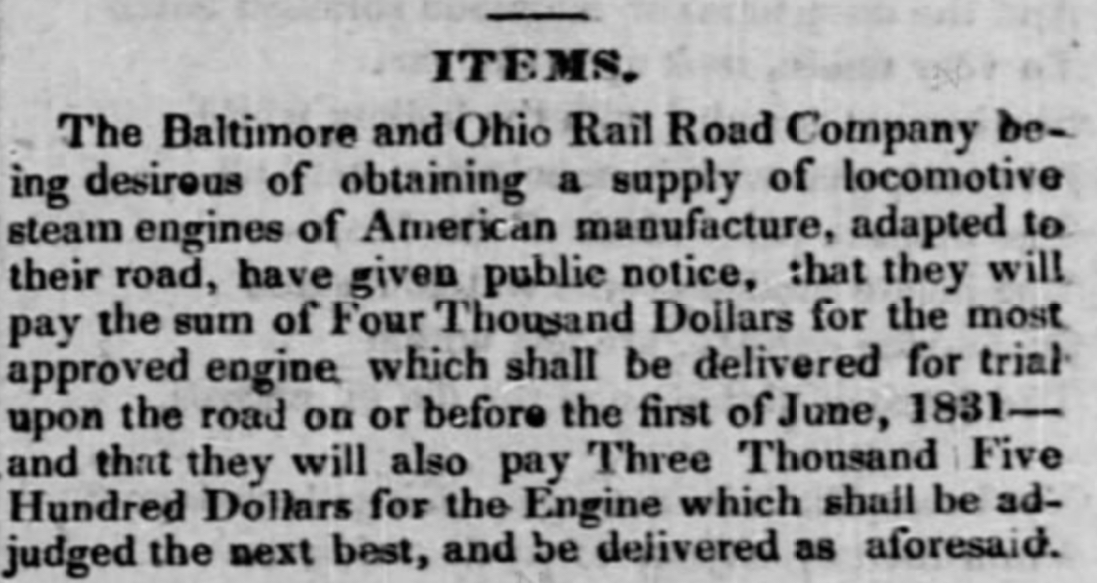
Locomotives sought by the Baltimore and Ohio Railroad, 1831

The Relay House was a 3-story, 32-room restaurant-inn-stables, built for the use of horse-drawn cars traveling between Baltimore and Ellicott's Mills (13 miles (21 km)); this was the first part built of what would become the Railroad's main line to Wheeling, Virginia (since 1863, West Virginia). The main cargo at that time was barrels of flour from the mills, taken to Baltimore. Passenger service was also provided.

The "relays" were horses, that would be swapped at the Relay House.

In 1830 there took place the famous, perhaps mythical, race between a horse and a demonstration locomotive engine, the Tom Thumb, the first locomotive built in America. The race began at Baltimore and ended at the Relay House. The engine misfunctioned and the horse won, but the viability of steam locomotives was successfully demonstrated. This building survives and as of 2025 is a private residence.

=== Relay Station ===
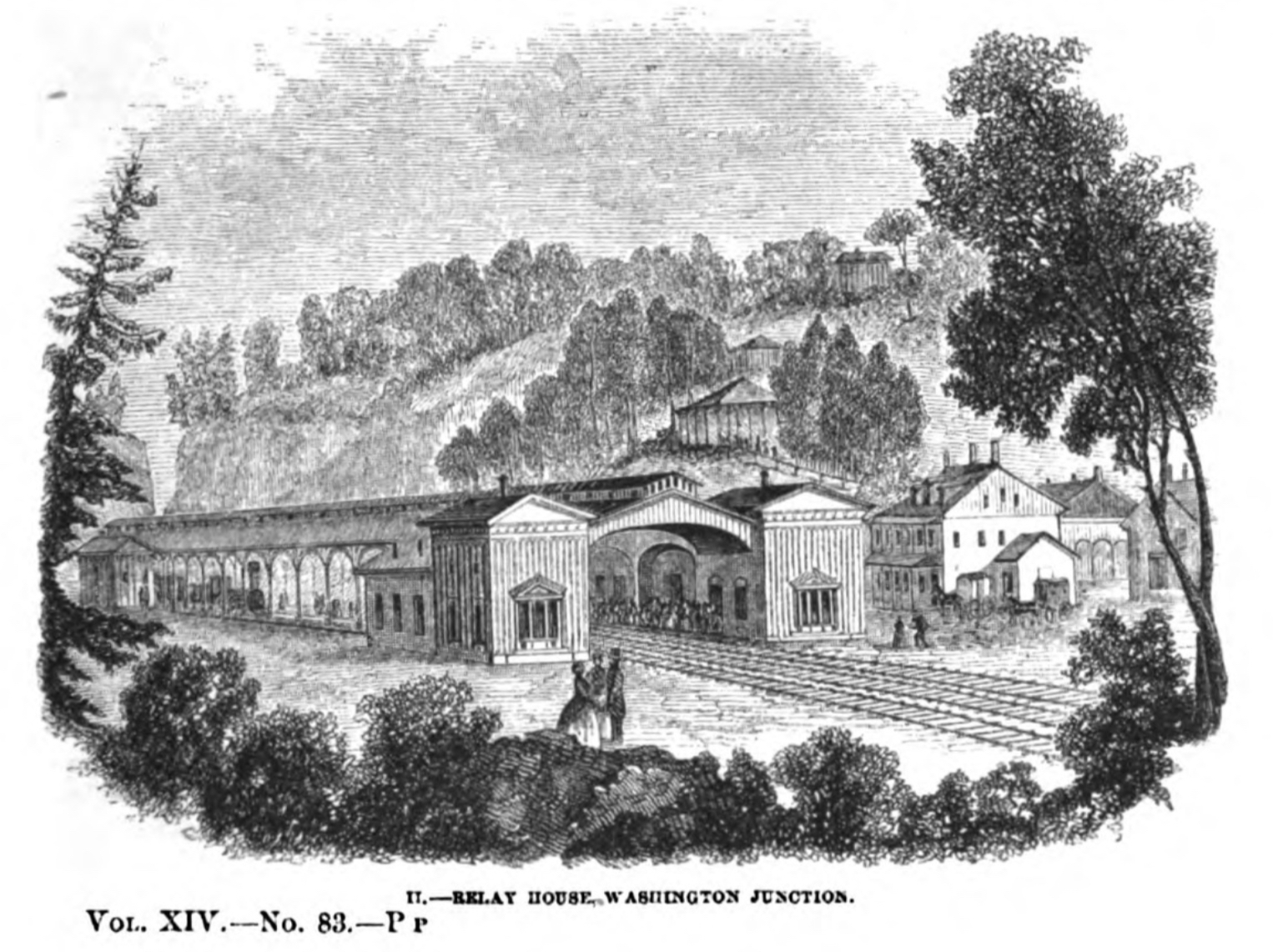
Relay Station, Maryland. Note to the right the former station, and traces of the tracks which ran in front of it prior to the opening of the line to Washington.

In 1835 the Thomas Viaduct opened, providing the first rail service to Washington, D.C., and the use of horses was discontinued, although the station was still called Relay on railroad maps.

The tracks were slightly relocated, meaning the Relay House was no longer adjacent to the tracks. New platforms with benches and roofs were built along the tracks, but the Relay House was still close enough that trains could stop for meal breaks.

Before the Civil War, it was a station and an important junction and transfer point on the Baltimore and Ohio Railroad, where the track from Washington, D.C., merged into the Railroad's main Baltimore–Wheeling line. There was a wye junction. It was the most complicated station on the line, and the 2nd busiest, after Baltimore. The names Relay and Relay House occur frequently in the reports on John Brown's raid on Harpers Ferry, the last major event before the Civil War caused operations on the line to be shut down.

=== Viaduct Hotel ===
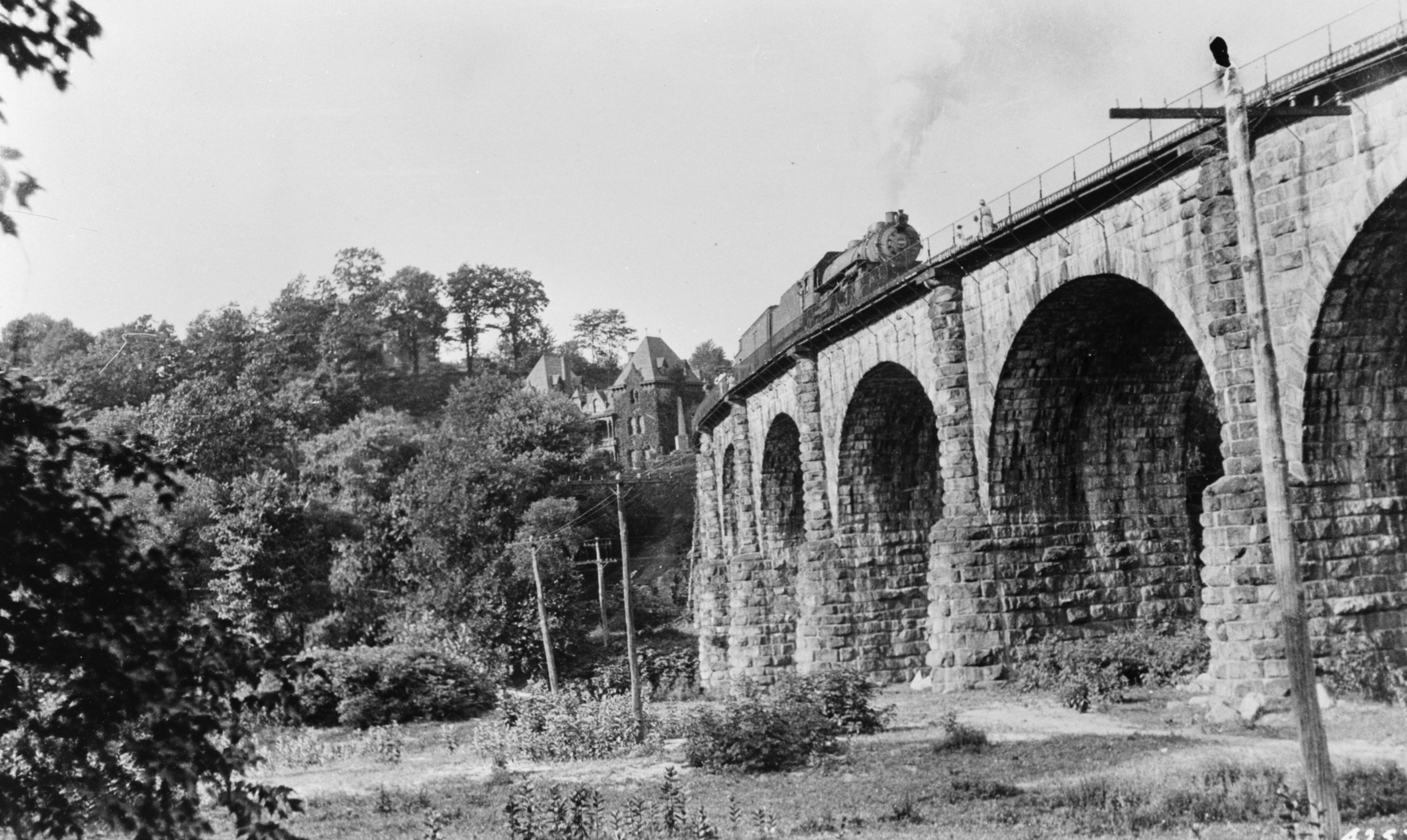
Thomas Viaduct, with Viaduct Hotel in the background.

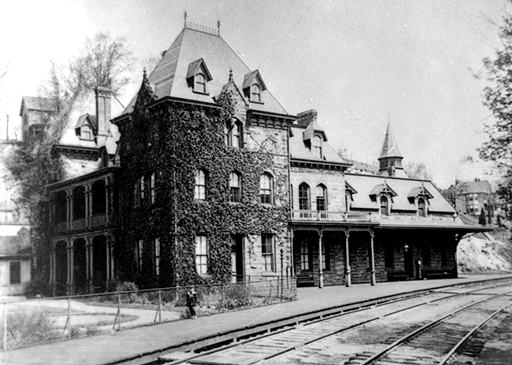
Viaduct Hotel and Station

After the war, normal traffic could resume. In 1872 the railroad built a four-story, granite Victorian-style combination hotel and station called the Viaduct Hotel; it was also referred to as the Relay Hotel. It was not a conventional hotel; it was for the use of train crew and passengers only. Trains would have scheduled meal stops, so passengers changing trains might have to spend some hours in Relay. There was a barber and a post office. It was also used for B&O meetings and dinners and housing for railroad workers.

By about 1900, faster intercity trains and the introduction of dining cars and sleeping cars made the Viaduct Hotel obsolete. It gradually lost customers and closed in 1938; it was demolished in 1950. A marker formerly at the site of the hotel/station is now in the Baltimore and Ohio Railroad Museum, in Baltimore. A miniature recreation of the hotel has been built.
