= Hesston, Indiana =

- Unincorporated community
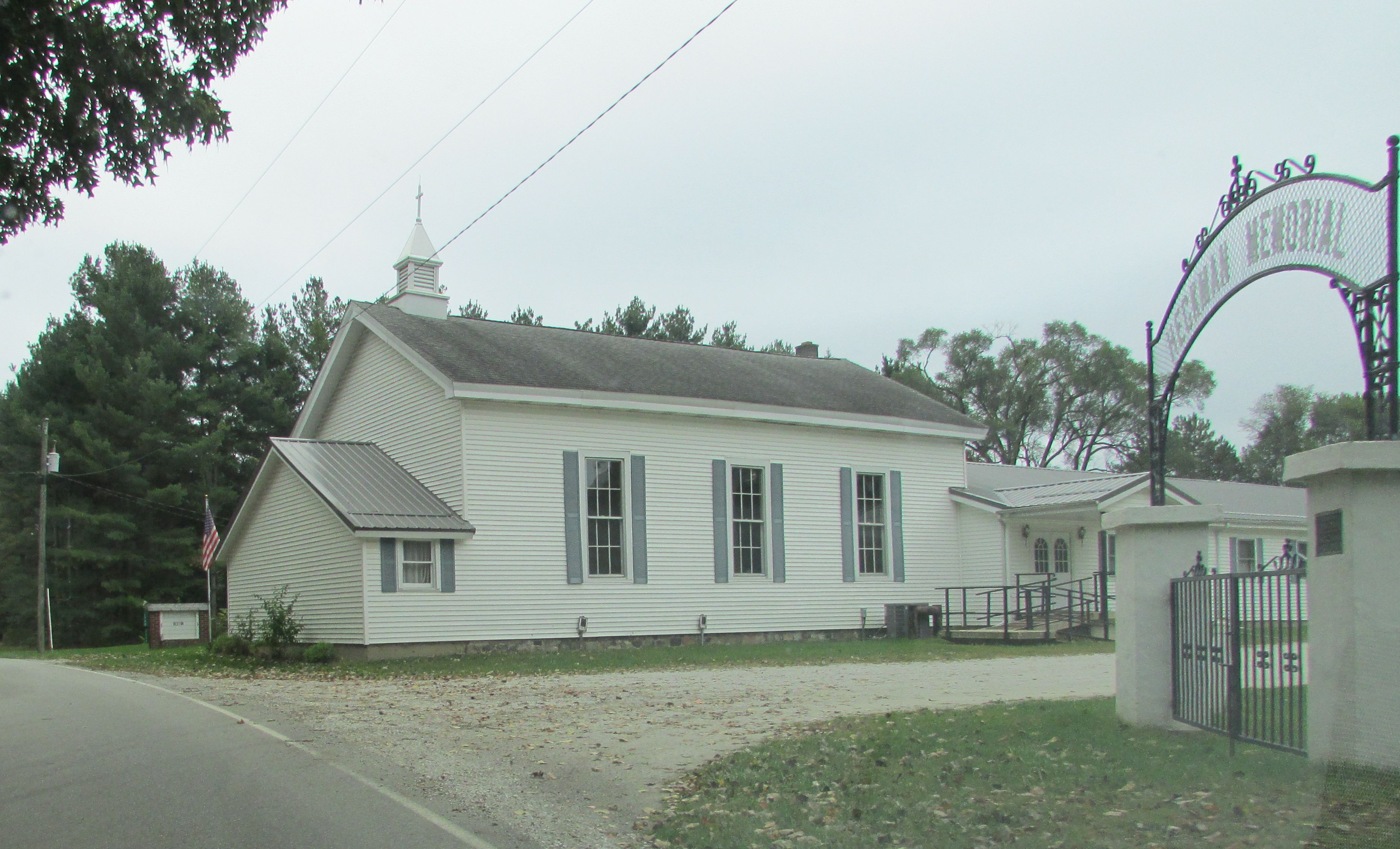
- Christian Church building, Hesston, Indiana.

- Location within Indiana Location within the United States
- Coordinates: 41°45′10″N 86°39′39″W
- Country: United States
- State: Indiana
- County: LaPorte
- Township: Galena
- Elevation: 640 ft (200 m)
- ZIP code: 46350
- FIPS code: 18-33232
- GNIS feature ID: 436073

Hesston is an unincorporated community in Galena Township, LaPorte County, Indiana.

== History ==
Originally called Mayes' Corners after Matthew Mayes opened a blacksmith in 1835. In 1857, Valentine Smith established a sawmill west of Mayes' Corner near the Galena River. It burned in 1862. In 1865, the Christian Church established a congregation in this area with Rev. Caleb Davis leading the congregation, before he moved to Michigan. P.M. Hess came to the township in 1856 from New York and began farming. He ran a sawmill and operated a store, contributing his name to the location. A post office was established at Hesston in 1877, and remained in operation until it was discontinued in 1900. The community was named for P. M. Hess, an early settler.

== Culture ==
The Hesston Steam Museum, which contains several railroads with multiple track gauges including 3 ft (914 mm) narrow gauge, 2 ft (610 mm) narrow gauge, 14 in (356 mm) gauge, and 7 1/2 in (190.5 mm) gauge, is located just west of Hesston.
