= Hesston Steam Museum =

Museum in Hesston, Indiana

- Location within Indiana
- Location: Galena Township, LaPorte County, Indiana
- Nearest town: Hesston, Indiana
- Coordinates: 41.754036°N 86.677953°W
- Area: 155 acres (0.242 sq mi; 63 ha; 0.63 km^{2})
- Established: 1956
- Website: www.hesston.org

Hesston Steam Museum is an outdoor museum operated by the La Porte County Historical Steam Society in Hesston, Indiana. It is located at 1201 E 1000 N, La Porte, IN 46350. The museum occupies 155 acres and is the home of four different gauge railroads along with numerous other pieces of steam powered and vintage farm equipment.

== History ==
=== The beginnings ===
The desire of a few local steam buffs to perpetuate the use of steam power necessitated the purchase of suitable land for an annual reunion. Twenty two acres (the present main show grounds) were purchased and hundreds of thorn apple trees cleared. A dam was built in Mud Creek to form Duck Lake as a source of water for the engines. The group, then called La Porte County Threshermen, held their first show and reunion in 1957. Traction engines were the main feature, and provided most of the power. A sawmill was added in 1959, the electric plant in 1961, and the Browning crane in 1962. In 1964, at the suggestion of Bruce Achor, a steam locomotive was purchased from Elliott Donnelley of Lake Forest, IL, who took an interest in the accomplishments at Hesston. During 1965–1968, with the generous financial assistance of Mr. Donnelley, the remainder of the 155-acre site was purchased and a unique dual gauge (2 ft (610 mm) and 3 ft (914 mm)) railroad was constructed. The La Porte County Historical Steam Society, Inc. was chartered as a not-for-profit organization on December 16, 1968, and the original La Porte County Threshermen club was absorbed and dissolved. In 1969 the IRS granted recognition as a 501(c)-3 not-for-profit corporation.

=== The railroad ===
Weekend (Memorial Day to Labor Day) operation of the railroad began in 1969. Additional buildings were erected and more equipment arrived for restoration and exhibit each year. The Shay locomotive restoration was completed and dedicated August 30, 1975. Donnelley died in late December 1975, and upon his death his family donated the 14 in (356 mm) gauge railroad that had operated on his Lake Forest estate. The railroad was removed by society members during 1976 and moved to the steam grounds. Reconstruction of the 14 in gauge railroad began in 1977 and was completed in 1982.

=== Fire ===
A fire on May 26, 1985, destroyed most of the large railroad equipment. Nine cars, the Henschel, and a diesel locomotive, along with many tools and small parts were lost. Also badly damaged were the Shay, Porter and India locomotives. The damage from the fire was estimated to be $2.5 million. In response to this fire members purchased two Plymouth gasoline locomotives, and with a Melodia coach purchased with a grant from the La Porte County Tourism and Convention Bureau, railroad operation (but not steam) resumed in time for the 1985 show. In early 1986, permission was received from the insurance company to begin salvage operations.

The India locomotive was bulldozed out of the engine house rubble on March 13, 1986, and taken to the main shop for restoration. Just 89 days later it was back on the rails and under steam. The next day, construction started on two 2 ft (610 mm) gauge passenger cars. Dr. George Mohun of Novato California contacted the society and offered 4 locomotives and 8 flat cars, the remains of the Mecklenburg-Pommersche Schmalspurbahn Railroad in East Germany, which had been intended for a steam tourist railway near San Francisco. This railroad was never constructed, and the equipment was stored on his ranch for 17 years. After an inspection trip funds were borrowed and the equipment was purchased.

The equipment arrived on April 14, 1987. The brand-new, yet 47 years old, CSK was immediately placed in the shop for cleaning and inspection. It was fired up for the first time ever in August 1987, and now serves as the regular locomotive for weekend operation. The India locomotive was retired in 1988 after a crack developed in the copper firebox, not quite making it to 100 years of operation. In 1990 the Orenstein & Koppel 0-8-0 was moved to the shop for a heavy restoration; in 1997 it was temporarily de-superheated, and in 1998 was reflued by the Hesston shop crew. Also in 1998, work started on construction of an enclosed passenger coach for the 2 ft gauge line. In November, 1998 two 3 ft gauge passenger coaches were purchased and transported from Cedar Point at Sandusky, OH.

== Railroads ==
The museum features four different gauges of railroads operating on three different routes.

== Locomotives ==
Locomotive details
| Number | Original Owner | Gauge | Type | Builder | Built | Status | Notes |
|---|---|---|---|---|---|---|---|
| 1 | Indianapolis Power & Light | Standard | 0-4-0F | Porter Locomotive Works | 1950 | Non-Operational | Running gear and frame only. From Indiana Transportation Museum |
| 2 | United Fruit Company | 3 ft (914 mm) | 2-6-0 | Porter Locomotive Works | 1911 | Operational | Returned to operation in 2019. |
| 7 | New Mexico Lumber Company | 3 ft 36 inch | Class C (Three truck) Shay | Lima Locomotive Works | 1929 | Operational | Last narrow gauge Shay locomotive built. |
| 17 | United Fruit Company | 36 inch | 2-6-0 | Porter Locomotive Works | 1920 | Under restoration | To be returned to operation. From the Gilmore Car Museum. |
| 125 | A. Meyer (?) | 2 ft (610 mm) | 0-4-0T | Ceskomoravska Kolben-Danek | 1940 | Operational | From Czech Republic. |
| 242 | Brookfield Zoo | 24 inch | 2-4-2 | Sandley Locomotive Works | 1972 | Operational | Named "James R. Donnelley". |
| 99 3361 | Deutsche Reichsbahn | 24 inch | 0-8-0 | Orenstein & Koppel | 1938 | Stored | From Germany. |
| 1 | German Army | 24 inch | 2-8-0 | Arnold Jung | 1918 | Stored | Named Feldbahn. From the Brookfield Zoo. |
| 3001 | Kiddieland Amusement Park | 14 inch | 4-8-4 | Wagner and Sons Miniature Train Company | 1949 | Stored | |
| 4001 | Kiddieland Amusement Park | 14 inch | 4-6-4 | Wagner and Sons Miniature Train Company | 1941 | Operational | |
| 3 | Stet and Query Central | 14 inch | 4-4-0 | Built by Wagner & Son. Cab modified by Sandley Works when owned by E. Donnelley | 1922 | Operational | |
| 1 | Kiddieland Amusement Park | 14 inch | 4-6-4 | Wagner & Son. | 1938 | Operational | |
| 5910-15 | OH Parks & Rec | 14 inch | 4-4-0 | Crown Metal Products | 1959 | Display | |
| N/A | Hesston Steam Museum | 3 ft | 2-2-0 | Rick Weber | 2022 | Operational | Half scale replica of the Tom Thumb locomotive. |
| 15 | Carpenter Steel | 2 ft | DDT 12-ton switcher | Plymouth Locomotive Works | 1958 | Operational | Used For Switching and Lighter Days. |
| 2 | Carpenter Steel | 2 ft | DDT 12 ton-switcher | Plymouth Locomotive Works | 1957 | Operational | Used For Switching and Lighter Days. |
| 3 | Inland Steel | 2 ft | DDT 12 ton-switcher | Plymouth Locomotive Works | 1958 | Stored | Burned in 1985 Fire. |
| 4 | Illinois Brick Company | 2 ft | DGT 10 ton-switcher | Plymouth Locomotive Works | 1953 | Operational | Used for switching and Lighter Days. |
| 999 | Brookfield Zoo | 2 ft | SW-1 | Sandley Locomotive Works | 1966 | Operational | Used for switching and Lighter Days. |
| 1 | Sullivan Machinery | 2 ft | 7 ton-switcher | Whitcomb Locomotive Works | 1923 | Display | |
| 5 | Stet and Query Central | 14 inch | Boxcab | Likely Sandley Locomotive Works | 19?? | Operational | Used For Switching. |

=== Narrow gauge ===
A unique three-rail, dual-gauge,narrow-gauge railroad runs on a two-and-a-half-mile (4 km) route around the museum property. The three-rail configuration allows both 3 ft (914 mm) and 2 ft (610 mm) narrow-gauge locomotives and cars to be operated on the same route.

=== 14 inch gauge ===
1/4 scale locomotives (14 in / 356 mm gauge) are steam or gasoline powered and were mainly built for amusement parks from the 1920s to the 1950s.

=== 7.5 inch gauge ===
Built by the people who run them, these trains run on track with rails only 7 1/2 in (190.5 mm) apart and travel through the heavily wooded hills and under a bridge in a one-mile (1.6 km) long winding route.

== Additional equipment ==
In addition to the three railroads at the museum there are numerous other pieces of steam powered and vintage farm equipment.

=== Saw mill ===
The Hesston Saw Mill was built in 1900 by the Hill-Curtis Machinery Company of Kalamazoo, Michigan and is typical of the mills that dotted the countryside in the 1890s. The mill features a 60-inch (1,524 mm) insert tooth blade, and is driven by a horizontal single-cylinder Uniflow steam engine manufactured by Skinner Engine Company of Erie, Pennsylvania.

=== Electric power plant ===
The power plant was the first to provide electric power to the LaPorte County, Indiana courthouse. The Allis-Chalmers engine originally ran the Sanders Saw mill in Elkhart, Indiana, having replaced the smaller Smith Mayers and Schneer engine next to it at the same location.

=== Steam traction engines ===
The museum's examples of the steam traction engine come from numerous manufacturers and were built between 1899 and 1922. Operation is in full swing at the Labor Day Weekend Steam & Power Show when the threshing machine is used to process grains for the fall harvest.

=== Tom Thumb locomotive ===
In September 2022, the museum announced the completion of a half-scale working model of the Tom Thumb locomotive, built by Rick Weber. The original Tom Thumb was the first working steam locomotive built in America, designed and built in 1830 by inventor, industrialist, entrepreneur, and philanthropist Peter Cooper. The model was on display at the museum's 66th Steam and Power Show.
