= Galena Township, LaPorte County, Indiana =

Galena Township
- Township
- Coordinates: 41°43′45″N 86°38′17″W
- Country: United States
- State: Indiana
- County: LaPorte

Government
  - Type: Indiana township

Area
  - Total: 27.17 sq mi (70.4 km^{2})
  - Land: 26.89 sq mi (69.6 km^{2})
  - Water: 0.28 sq mi (0.73 km^{2})
- Elevation: 751 ft (229 m)

Population (2020)
  - Total: 1,980
  - Density: 70.6/sq mi (27.3/km^{2})
- FIPS code: 18-26224
- GNIS feature ID: 453322

Galena Township is one of twenty-one townships in LaPorte County, Indiana. As of the 2020 census, its population was 1,980 (up from 1,899 at 2010) and it contained 979 housing units.

Galena Township was established in 1836.

== Communities ==
- Hesston is an unincorporated community located at 41°45′10″N 86°39′39″W within the northwest portion of the township. The Hesston Steam Museum is located in Hesston.

== Geography ==
According to the 2010 census, the township has a total area of 27.17 square miles (70.4 km^{2}), of which 26.89 square miles (69.6 km^{2}) (or 98.97%) is land and 0.28 square miles (0.73 km^{2}) (or 1.03%) is water.
