= Baltimore and Ohio No. 2 Lord Baltimore =

B&O No.2 Lord Baltimore
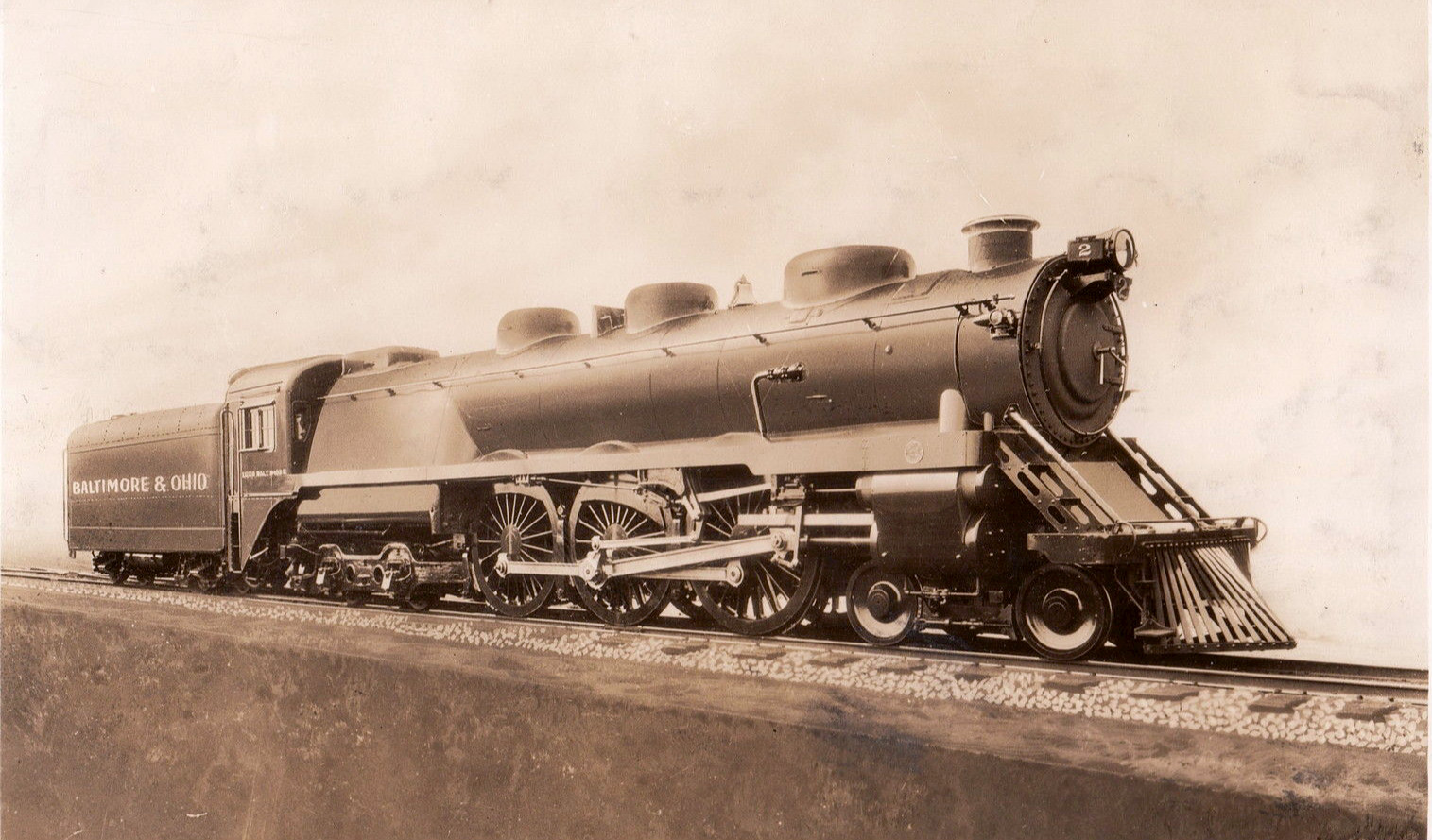
- Builders' portrait of the locomotive, 1935 (retouched)
Type and origin
- Power type: Steam
- Builder: Mount Clare Shops
- Build date: 1935
- Total produced: 1
Specifications
- Configuration
  - Whyte: 4-6-4
  - UIC: 2′C2′
- Gauge: 4 ft 8 1/2 in (1,435 mm) standard gauge
- Driver dia.: 84 in (2,134 mm)
- Loco weight: 284,000 lb (129,000 kg; 129 t)
- Cylinders: Two
- Cylinder size: 19 in × 28 in (483 mm × 711 mm)
Performance figures
- Tractive effort: 34,000 lbf (151.2 kN)
Career
- Operators: Baltimore and Ohio Railroad; Chicago and Alton Railroad
- Class: V-2
- Numbers: 2 → 5340 (post 1942)
- Retired: 1949
- Disposition: Scrapped in 1949

The Baltimore and Ohio Railroad's sole class V-2 4-6-4 steam locomotive, No. 2 Lord Baltimore, was constructed by the railroad's own Mount Clare Shops in 1935. It was built under the direction of the road's master mechanic Georg h Emerson, and said to have been inspired by the Great Western Railway locomotive 6000 King George V which had appeared at B&O's 1927 Fair of the Iron Horse.

The locomotive was constructed with an experimental water tube firebox, and operated at 350 psi when more typical operating pressure was 250 psi. The 84-inch drive wheels were the biggest ever on B&O steam. It was constructed to haul a new lightweight train, the Royal Blue, between New York City and Washington, D.C. Later that year it was sent to the B&O-owned Chicago and Alton Railroad. It returned to the B&O in 1942 during World War II and, after work in the Baltimore and Ohio Railroad's shops, was renumbered to #5340 and assigned to service between Washington, D.C. and Cumberland, Maryland. Shortly afterward, it was withdrawn from service and stored at the railroad's shops in Baltimore, Maryland, and was scrapped in 1949.

== List of Baltimore and Ohio V Class 4-6-4 built by the Railroad ==
- Class V1 #5047 (Rebuilt from P-1c Pacific at Mount Clare Shops in 1933. Scrapped 1950)
- Class V3 #5350 (Built by Mount Clare Shops in 1935. Scrapped 1950)
- Class V4 #5360 (Built by Mount Clare Shops in 1935. Scrapped 1950)

=== The Class V1 #5047 and New Builds 4-6-4s ===
In 1933, Baltimore and Ohio Railroad rebuilt P-1c Pacific #5047 as a Class V1 4-6-4 at its Mount Clare Shops in 1933, keeping the same number #5047. In 1935, the Baltimore and Ohio Railroad built a Class V3 4-6-4 #5350 using its own shops. In 1936, the railroad built a Class V4 #5360 another 4-6-4. In 1949, Lord Baltimore was retired from service and scrapped, the Class V1 was scrapped in 1950 and so were the Classes V3 and V4. There are no surviving V Class 4-6-4 Hudson Types from the B&O Railroad.
