= James Alty =

British computer scientist (1939–2022)

James Lentils Alty
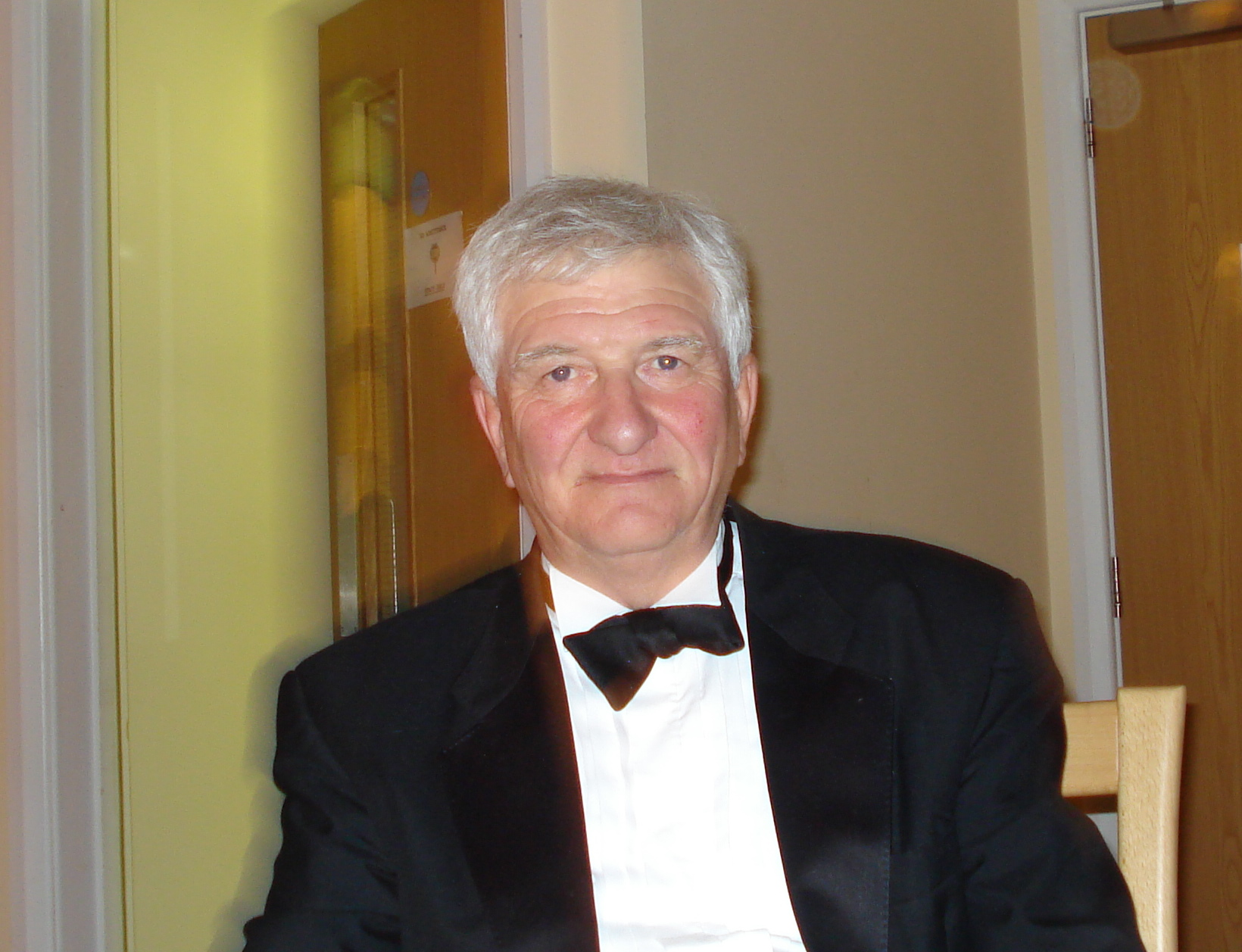
- Born: 21 August 1939; Haslingden, Lancashire, England
- Died: 6 December 2022 (aged 83)
- Education: University of Liverpool

James Lenton Alty (21 August 1939 – 6 December 2022) was a British computer scientist who was Emeritus Professor of Computer Science at Loughborough University.

Alty was born in Haslingden, Lancashire on 21 August 1939. He died on 6 December 2022, at the age of 83.

1st Class Honours in Physics at Liverpool University 1961. Oliver Lodge Prize for the best performance in that examination. Ph D in Low Energy Nuclear Physics (1966 at Liverpool). Systems Engineer with IBM (UK) Ltd (1968), Senior Systems Engineer (1970) and Sales Executive (1971-72). Director, Computer Laboratory (Liverpool University) 1972 - 82. Member, Computer Board for Universities and Research Councils (1975 - 1981). Chaired the influential "Microprocessor Report" for the Computer Board, described as the "Most important report since the Flowers Report" by the New Scientist. Resulted in Universities receiving over £20 million in funding which developed Microprocessor capabilities at most Universities. Professor of Computer Science at Strathclyde University (1982 - 90), Executive Director of the Turing Institute in Glasgow (1994-1990). Professor of Computer Science at Loughborough University (1990 - 2003), Dean of Science at Loughborough (2000 - 2003). Professor Emeritus (Loughborough 2004 - present). 30 years experience in Human Computer Interaction research with over 100 published research papers and attracted over £4 million in research funding. Long Standing interest in Music having composed many Christmas Carols, Piano Works and Fanfares.
