= Baltimore and Ohio class S =

Class of American steam locomotives

S class S-1 and S-1a Class
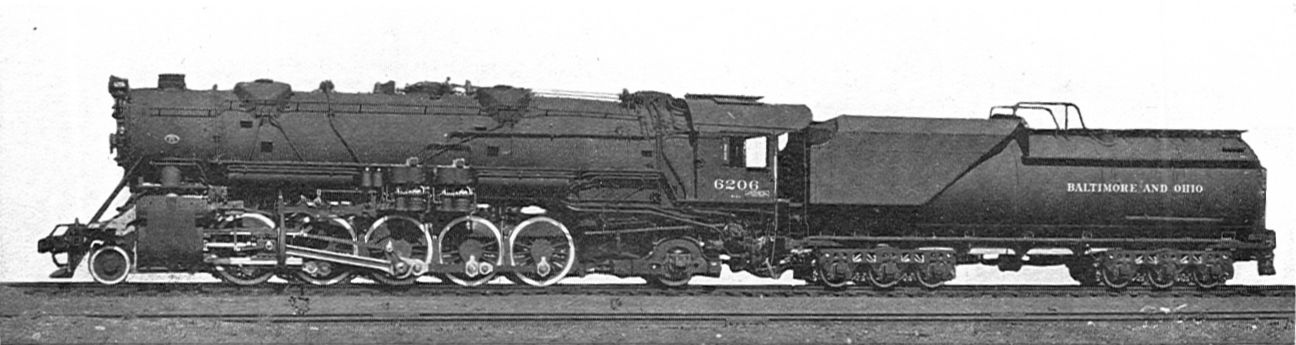
- B&O S-1a class #6206 in 1928
Type and origin
- Power type: Steam
- Builder: Baldwin Locomotive Works; Lima Locomotive Works
- Build date: 1914,1923–1926
- Total produced: 31 (Class S) 75 (Class S-1) 50 (Class S-1a)
- Rebuilder: B&O
- Rebuild date: 1925
- Number rebuilt: 2 (6009 and 6030)
Specifications
- Configuration
  - Whyte: 2-10-2
- Gauge: 4 ft 8 1/2 in (1,435 mm) standard gauge
- Driver dia.: 58 in:1473 mm(S class) 64 in:1626 mm(S-1 class)
- Wheelbase
  - Engine: 436.510 Ib(198.0 t : S-1 class) (184.16 : S Class)
  - Drivers: 347.230 Ib(157.5 t S-1 class) (152.77 t : S class)
- Boiler
  - Diameter: 90 in to 100 in (2286 mm to 2540 mm : S-1 class)
- Boiler pressure: 220 Ib:15.5 kg/cm2(S-1 class) 200 Ib:14.1 kg/cm2(S Class )
- Heating surface
  - Firebox: 262 sq.ft(S-1 class)
  - Tubes: 4881 sp.ft(140.5 m2 : S-1 class)
  - Total surface: 5270 sq.ft(489.6 m2 : S-1 class) (517.8 m2 : S class)
- Superheater
  - Heating area: 1512 sq.in(140.5 m2 : S-1 class) (123.5 m2 : S class)
- Cylinder size: 30 in x 32 in (762 mm x 813 mm : S-1 class) 30 in x 32 in (762 mm x 813 mm : S class)
Performance figures
- Maximum speed: 55-75 Mph
Career
- Operators: Baltimore and Ohio Railroad
- Class: S, S-1 and S-1a
- Number in class: 31 (S class) 125 (S-1)
- Numbers: 6000–6030 (S class) 6100-6224 (S-1 Class)
- Nicknames: "big sixes"
- Locale: Eastern United States
- Retired: 1926 (2) 1938 (15) 1953-1959 (Remainder)
- Preserved: 0
- Scrapped: 1926,1938,1953-1959
- Disposition: All Scrapped by 1959.

Baltimore and Ohio Class S comprised three classes of 2-10-2 locomotives.

The S class proper were 31 locomotives built in 1914 by Baldwin Locomotive Works and numbered 6000–6030. The S-1 class comprised 50 locomotives numbered 6100–6149, and 25 locomotives numbered 6150-6174. They were built between 1923 and 1924, 75 by Baldwin and by Lima Locomotive Works . The Class S-1a were built in 1926. The first batch of 25 were built by Lima, and numbered 6175-6199. The second batch was built by Baldwin, and numbered 6200-6224. They were nicknamed "big sixes" because until renumbering in 1954 their road numbers all began with 6. Locomotives numbered 6009 and 6030 were scrapped in 1925, and their boilers used to build new Class T 4-8-2 Mountain Type locomotives numbered 5500 & 5501. 15 of the Class were retired and scrapped in 1938. The remainder of S-1/S-1a continued service until 1953-1959.

None of the B&O Class S 2-10-2s were preserved.
