= Baltimore and Ohio 4500 =

Preserved B&O O-3 class 2-8-2 locomotive

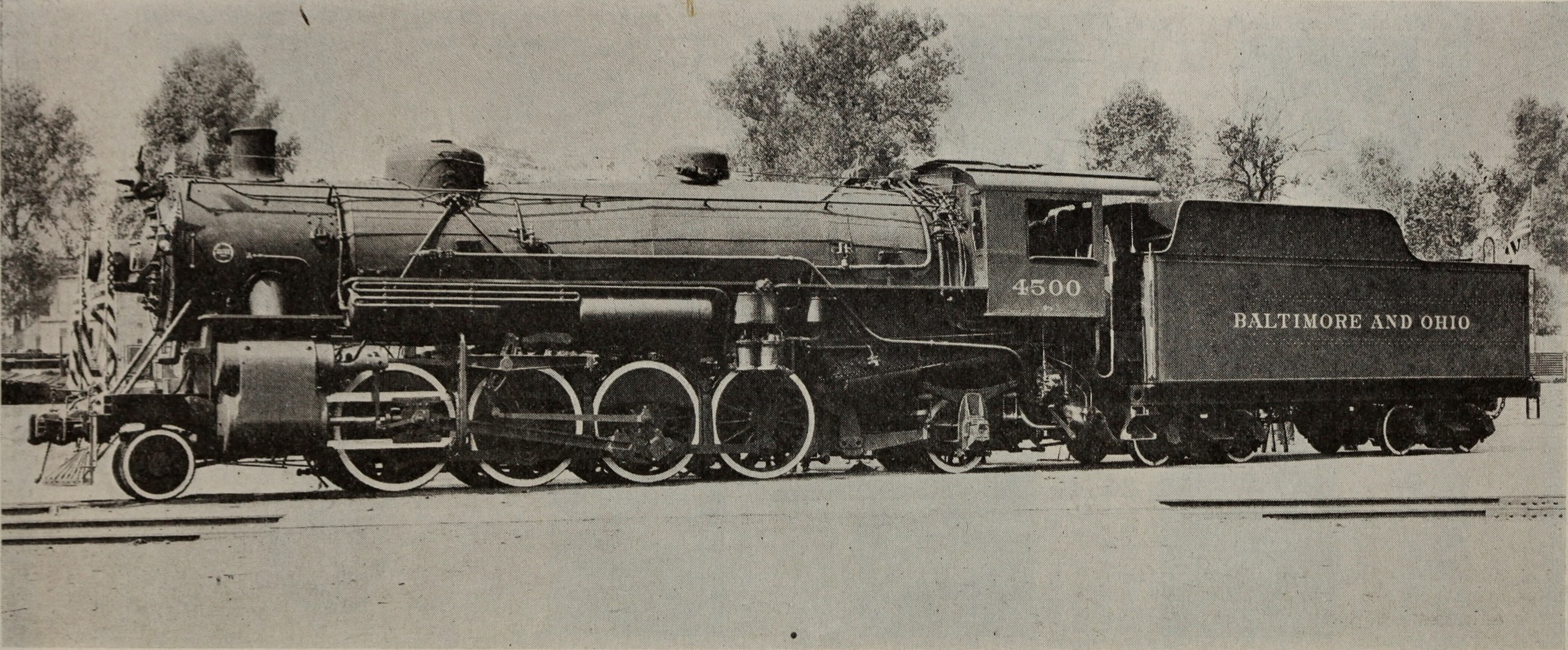
- B&O 4500 as it was built in 1918
Type and origin
- Power type: Steam
- Builder: Baldwin Locomotive Works
- Order number: 18038
- Serial number: 49153
- Build date: May 1, 1918 (ordered) to July 4, 1918 (delivered)
- Total produced: 100
Specifications
- Configuration
  - Whyte: 2-8-2
  - UIC: 1′D2′ h1
- Gauge: 4 ft 8 1/2 in (1,435 mm) standard gauge
- Leading dia.: 33 in (838 mm)
- Driver dia.: 63 in (1,600 mm)
- Trailing dia.: 43 in (1,092 mm)
- Tender wheels: 33 in.
- Wheelbase: Loco & tender: 36 ft (10.97 m)
- Axle load: 55,200 lb (25,000 kilograms; 25.0 metric tons)
- Adhesive weight: 220,000 lb (100,000 kilograms; 100 metric tons)
- Loco weight: 292,000 lb (132,000 kilograms; 132 metric tons)
- Tender weight: 185,400 lb (84,100 kilograms; 84.1 metric tons)
- Total weight: 477,400 lb (216,500 kilograms; 216.5 metric tons)
- Fuel type: Coal
- Fuel capacity: 16 t (16 long tons; 18 short tons)
- Water cap.: 10,000 US gal (38,000 L; 8,300 imp gal)
- Firebox
  - Grate area: 66.70 sq ft (6.197 m^{2})
- Boiler
  - Type: Wagontop Style
  - Tube plates: 19 ft
  - Small tubes: 216 total tubes at 2.25" diameter
  - Large tubes: 40 total superheater flues at 5.5" diameter
- Boiler pressure: 200 lbf/in^{2} (1.38 MPa)
- Heating surface
  - Firebox: 286 sq ft (26.6 m^{2})
  - Tubes and flues: 3497 Sq. Ft.
  - Total surface: 3783 Sq. Ft.
- Superheater
  - Type: Type A
  - Heating area: 882 sq ft (81.9 m^{2})
- Cylinders: Two, outside
- Cylinder size: 26 in × 30 in (660 mm × 762 mm)
- Valve gear: Walschaert
- Valve type: Piston valves
- Valve travel: 7 in
- Valve lap: 1.125 in
- Valve lead: 0.1875 in
- Loco brake: Westinghouse 6ET Air Brake
- Train brakes: Air
- Couplers: Type E Knuckle
Performance figures
- Maximum speed: 60 mph
- Tractive effort: 54600 lbs
- Factor of adh.: 4.08
Career
- Operators: Baltimore and Ohio
- Class: Q-3
- Number in class: 1st of 100
- Numbers: B&O 4500; B&O 300 (from 1957-late 1958)
- Nicknames: MacArthur type
- Locale: B&O Railroad system
- First run: July 1918
- Retired: August 1957
- Preserved: 1958
- Current owner: National Museum of Railroad History & Innovation
- Disposition: On static display

Baltimore and Ohio 4500 is a 2-8-2 "USRA Light Mikado" steam locomotive built by the Baldwin Locomotive Works in Philadelphia, Pennsylvania in July 1918 for the Baltimore and Ohio Railroad (B&O) as a member of the Q-3 class.

The locomotive hauled freight for the B&O until retirement in August 1957 and was donated for display at the National Museum of Railroad History & Innovation in Baltimore, Maryland. It is the sole surviving Baltimore and Ohio Mikado type steam locomotive.

== History ==
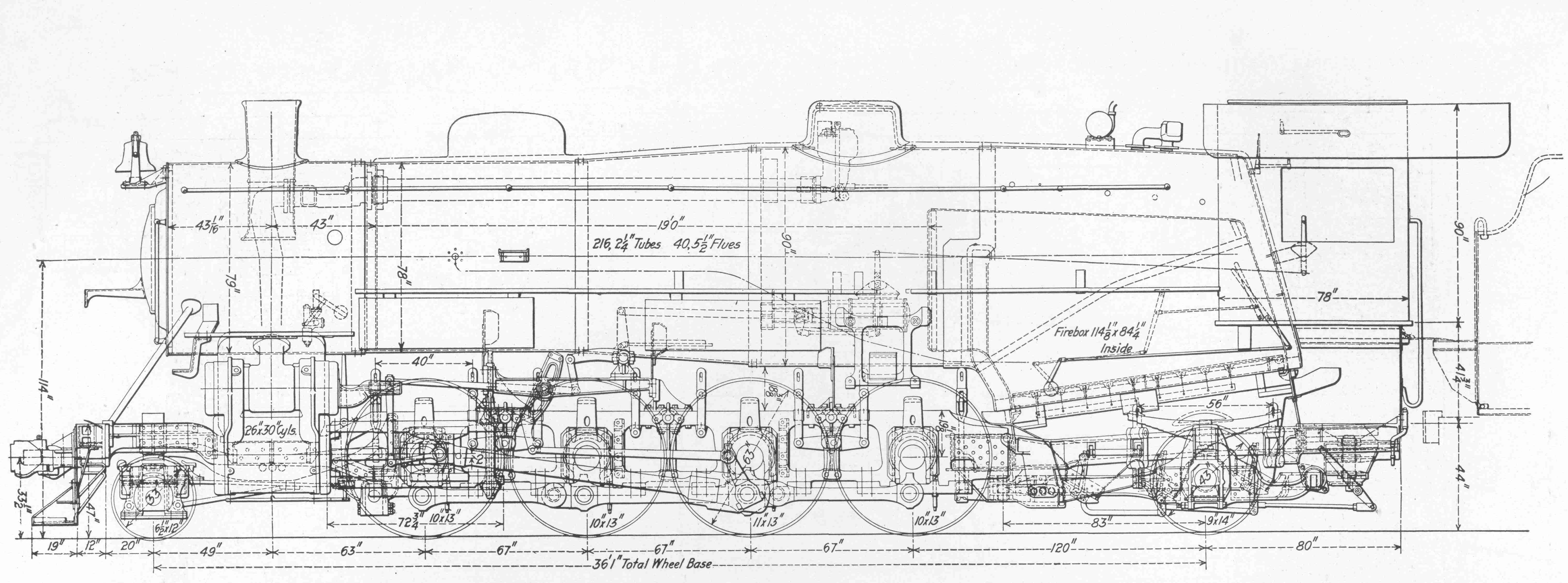
General arrangement drawing.

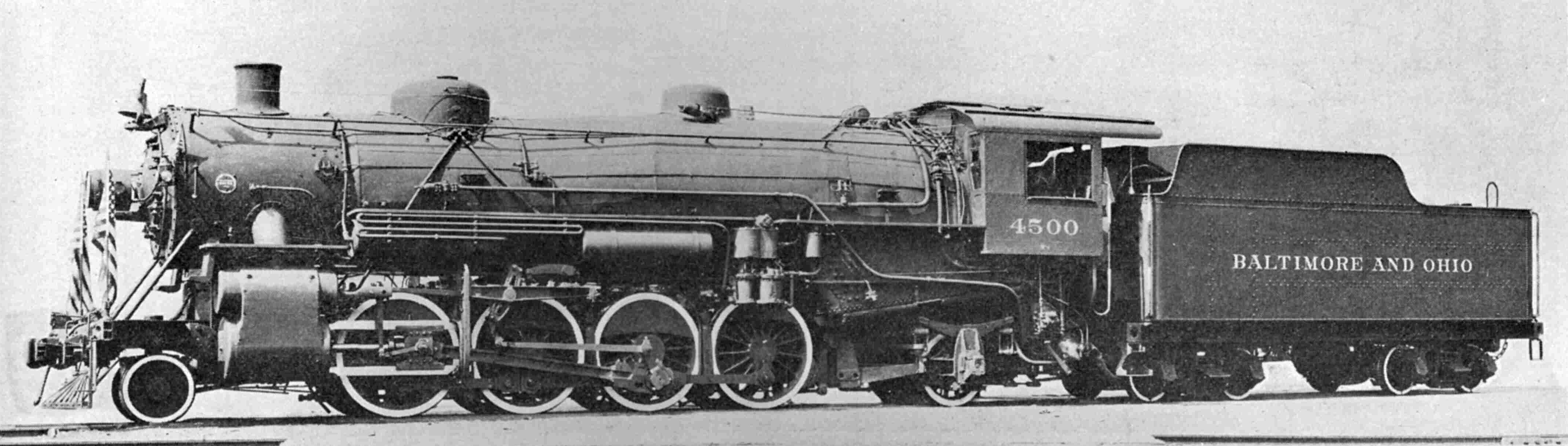
Builder's Photo of B&O #4500

The locomotive was the very first USRA locomotive built and it was constructed in just twenty days. It was also finished on July 4, 1918, and it was decked out with American Flags for the occasion. While it has mostly remained as built mechanically, it received some of B&O's distinctive cosmetic and mechanical changes throughout its service life. The locomotive retains the original tender and trailing truck. During its service life, the locomotive was in freight service primarily on the Ohio and St. Louis divisions of the railroad.

The Baltimore & Ohio Railroad No. 4500 is a class Q-3 2-8-2 'Mikado' type steam locomotive, built by the Baldwin Locomotive Works in 1918. Following America's entry into WWI, the USRA nationalised the nation's railroad system in the interest of ensuring the most efficient operations possible. Ironically, WWI was almost over when No. 4500 was ready for service on 4 July 1918. Like the other USRA designs, No. 4500 was popular with shop workers and engine crews. It was also popular with the railroad companies with a total of six hundred and forty-one copies of the type produced by/for different US railroads in the years following the war.

The B&O Q-3s were the first USRA Light Mikados built, as well as the first of any type of USRA engine built. 100 locomotives were built from July 1918 to February 1919. They had 63 inch driving wheels, a tractive effort of 54,600 lbs, and 200 psi boiler. Their tenders could hold up to 10,000 gallons of water and 16 tons of coal. Based on employee interviews, the locomotive crews described these engines as strong, fast, and easy riding making the Q-3 class popular with the engine crews. On New Year's Day 1957, the B&O renumbered all the engines in all classes to 3 digit numbers. The Q-3 class was renumbered from a 4500 - 4599 range to a 300 - 399 range to make way for new diesels. In 1956, the first of the Q-3s were retired from service and after the 1957 renumbering, the B&O began retiring some of the Q-3 class.

No. 4500 operated on the B&O's Ohio Division mainly hauling freight until it was retired from service in 1957, and it was donated to the National Museum of Railroad History & Innovation in 1960 where it is placed on static display today. In 1957, the locomotive was renumbered 300 to make room for four-digit diesel locomotives.

== Preservation ==
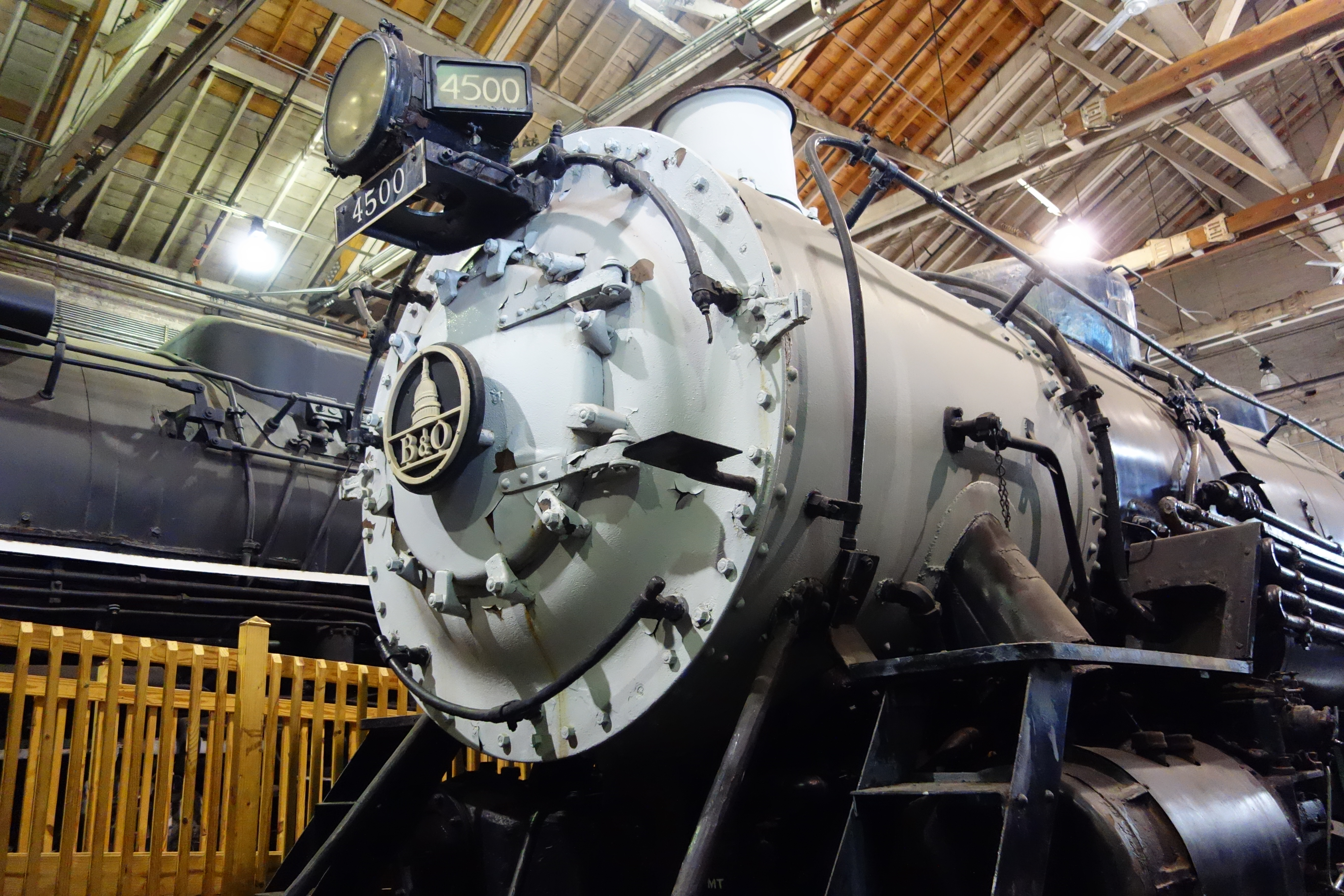
B&O 4500 on display at the National Museum of Railroad History & Innovation in Baltimore, October 2017

In August 1957, 4500, still numbered 300, was retired. In 1964 it was purchased, along with B&O 5300, for safe keeping and eventual donation by Ed Striegel of Striegel Supply & Equipment Corp., a business on Chemical Road in Curtis Bay, MD. Mr. Striegel bought railroad equipment for parting out and future sales to other railroads, this though was not the case for 5300 and 4500. Upon Mr. Striegel's death, the Baltimore Sun wrote, "In the 1950s, while visiting a storage lot for decommissioned B&O steam engines, Mr. Striegel discovered two historically significant locomotives - the President Washington, No. 5300, the high-wheeling Pacific Class that had pulled such classic trains as the Capitol Limited; and a 2-8-2 Mikado Class locomotive that had been built in 1918. He salvaged them and donated them to the B&O; Railroad Museum. 'They are the linchpins of our collection,' said Courtney B. Wilson, executive director of the museum. 'Ed saved two significant pieces for the museum and, without his help, they would have been lost forever,' he said. 'In my opinion, he was a phenomenal Baltimorean. He was a quiet, unassuming and a very generous guy. The museum was his favorite place to come and he was always looking for ways to improve and enhance its collections,' Mr. Wilson said." In 1990, the locomotive was designated as a National Historic Mechanical Engineering Landmark by the American Society of Mechanical Engineers. Today, it still resides there on display alongside 4-6-2 No. 5300.
