= Baltimore and Ohio P-7 =

Class of 20 American 4-6-2 type locomotives

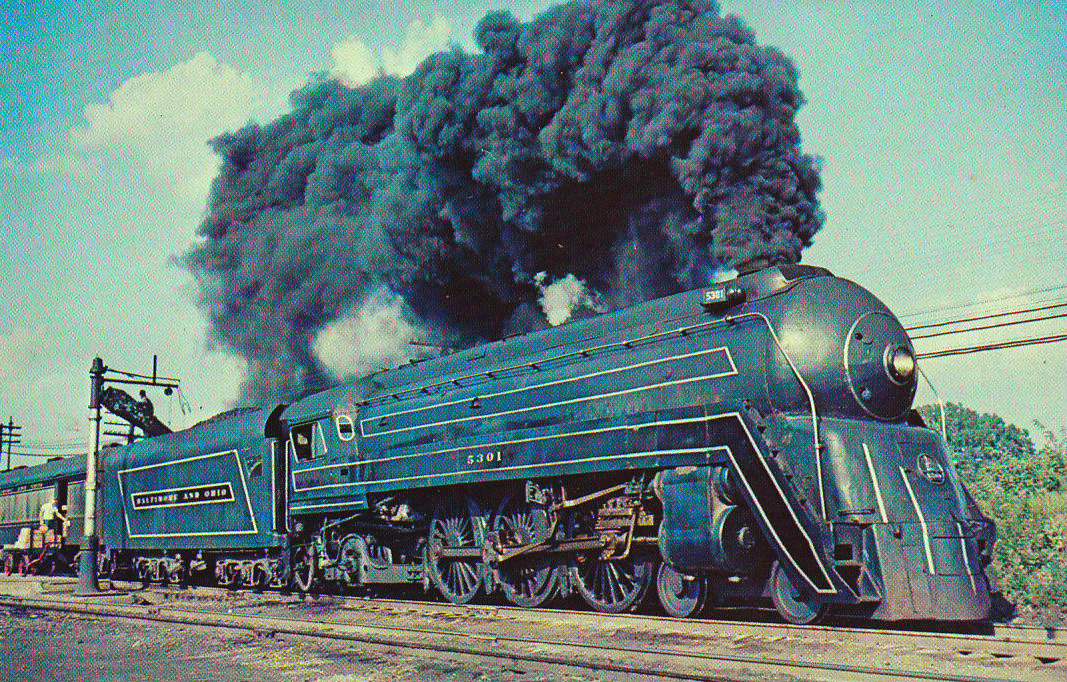
Type and origin
- Power type: Steam
- Builder: Baldwin Locomotive Works
- Serial number: 59881–59886, 59928–59937, 59973–59976
- Build date: 1927
- Total produced: 20
Specifications
- Configuration
  - Whyte: 4-6-2
  - UIC: 2′C1′ h2
- Gauge: 4 ft 8 1/2 in (1,435 mm)
- Driver dia.: 80 in (2,032 mm)
- Axle load: 67,000 lb (30,000 kilograms; 30 metric tons)
- Adhesive weight: 201,000 lb (91,000 kg; 91 t)
- Loco weight: 326,000 lb (148,000 kg; 148 t)
- Tender weight: 218,000 lb (99,000 kg; 99 t)
- Total weight: 544,000 lb (247,000 kg; 247 t)
- Fuel type: Coal
- Fuel capacity: 17 t (17 long tons; 19 short tons)
- Water cap.: 11,000 US gal (42,000 L; 9,200 imp gal)
- Firebox
  - Grate area: 70.3 sq ft (6.53 m^{2})
- Boiler pressure: 230 psi (1.6 MPa)
- Cylinders: 2
- Cylinder size: 27 in × 28 in (686 mm × 711 mm)
Performance figures
- Maximum speed: 85 mph (137 km/h)
- Tractive effort: 50,000 lbf (220 kN)
- Factor of adh.: 4.03
Career
- Retired: 1958 (last)
- Preserved: One preserved (No. 5300)
- Disposition: B&O 5300 preserved in Baltimore Maryland, remainder scrapped.

The Baltimore and Ohio’s P-7 class is a class of 20 4-6-2 "Pacific" type locomotives built in 1927. Named for the first 20 Presidents of the United States, they were the prime motive power for the B&O’s top passenger trains for 31 years. One example, Baltimore and Ohio 5300, the "President Washington", has been preserved.

== Design ==
The P7s were rather simple locomotives when built. Bearing a considerable resemblance to the Pennsylvania Railroad’s K4s, the two designs did differ in their style of firebox and boiler pressure. The engines produced 50,000 lbf (220 kN) of starting tractive effort and could pull heavyweight passenger trains up to 80 mph (130 km/h). Water scoops mounted on the underside of the tender allowed the locomotives to refill their 11,000 US gal (42,000 L) tanks without stopping. The cabs of the locomotives were equipped with automatic train control, which improved safety by forcibly applying the brakes if the engineer failed to acknowledge an unfavorable signal.

The engines would receive upgrades over their 31-year careers and some locomotives received streamlined shrouds, but the class never saw a major rebuild. In 1937 locomotive 5304 was rebuilt by the B&O into a Class P-7a streamlined locomotive. In 1942 locomotive 5306 was rebuilt into a Class P-7b streamlined locomotive. In 1944 locomotives 5305, 5308, 5309, 5318 were rebuilt into Class P-7c. In 1946 locomotives 5301-5303 were rebuilt into Class P-7d’s. Locomotive 5304 was also rebuilt to Class P-7d in 1946.

List of B&O P Class Pacifics Series
Class	Quantity	Road numbers*	Build year	Builder	Image
P	35	2100-2134	1906	ALCO. All Scrapped by 1950	
P-1	10	2135-2144	1911	Baldwin. All Scrapped by 1951	
P-1a	30	2145-2175	1911	Baldwin. All scrapped by 1952	
P-1c	30	5000-5009, 5035-5049, 5090-5094	1924	B&O. #5047 rebuilt to Class V1 Hudson. Rest scrapped 1953-1954	
P-3	30	5100-5129	1913	Baldwin. All scrapped 1955-1956	
P-4	10	5130-5139	1917	Baldwin. All scrapped 1957-1958	
P-5	30	5200-5229	1919	Baldwin, ALCO. All scrapped 1951-1955	
P-6	15	5230-5244	1923	Baldwin. All scrapped 1950-1953	
P-7	20	5300-5319	1927	Baldwin. Named after the first 20 U.S. presidents. All scrapped 1958 except for 5300.	
P-9	1	5320	1928	B&O. Scrapped 1958	

*The entries in this column are the numbers assigned to the locomotives when built. Some engines were renumbered before being retired.

List Of Class P7’s named after the first 20 Presidents
Road numbers*	Name	Build year	Notes
5300	George Washington	Built; 1927	Preserved
5301	John Adams; John Quincy Adams	Built; 1927	Scrapped
5302	Thomas Jefferson	Built; 1927	Scrapped
5303	James Madison	Built; 1927	Scrapped
5304	James Monroe	Built; 1927	Scrapped
5305	Andrew Jackson	Built; 1927	Scrapped
5306	Martin Van Buren	Built; 1927	Scrapped
5307	William Henry Harrison	Built; 1927	Scrapped
5308	John Tyler	Built; 1927	Scrapped
5309	James K. Polk	Built; 1927	Scrapped
5310	Zachary Taylor	Built; 1927	Scrapped
5311	Millard Fillmore	Built; 1927	Scrapped
5312	Franklin Pierce	Built; 1927	Scrapped
5313	James Buchanan	Built; 1927	Scrapped
5314	Abraham Lincoln	Built; 1927	Scrapped
5315	Andrew Johnson	Built; 1927	Scrapped
5316	Ulysses S. Grant	Built; 1927	Scrapped
5317	Rutherford B. Hayes	Built; 1927	Scrapped
5318	James A. Garfield	Built; 1927	Scrapped
5319	Chester A. Arthur	Built; 1927	Scrapped

== Service ==
With the introduction of the P-7 class into its passenger fleet, the B&O sought to distinguish itself from its competitors, mainly the Pennsylvania Railroad. To accomplish this, instead of the usual simplistic black paint scheme, each of the P-7s would be adorned with names after the first 20 Presidents of the United States (a single locomotive, “President Adams”, symbolized both John Adams and John Quincy Adams). Combined with a vibrant green paint scheme and gold trim, the railroad hoped to make the class more distinctive and memorable. The locomotives were put on display frequently for public relations, with the class making its debut performance at the Fair of the Iron Horse, which celebrated the railroad’s 100th anniversary in 1927.

The locomotives were used throughout the B&O’s network in the eastern US, with their most famous efforts being the Royal Blue, a high-speed train connecting Washington DC and Jersey City. Also used between Baltimore and Philadelphia, the engines were used mainly in the Midwest leading up to their retirement.

== Preservation ==
Being an early adopter of diesel power, the B&O retired the P7s by the late 1950s. No. 5300 was saved for safekeeping and donation by Ed Striegel of Striegel Supply & Equipment Corp., a business on Chemical Road in Curtis Bay, Maryland. Mr. Striegel bought railroad equipment for parting out and future sales to other railroads, this though was not the case for the steam locomotives on the property. Upon Mr. Striegel's death, the Baltimore Sun wrote, "In the 1950s, while visiting a storage lot for decommissioned B&O steam engines, Mr. Striegel discovered two historically significant locomotives – the President Washington, No. 100, the high-wheeling Pacific Class that had pulled such classic trains as the Capitol Limited, and a Q-3 class 2-8-2 Mikado type locomotive that had been built in 1918. He salvaged them and donated them to the B&O Railroad Museum. 'They are the linchpins of our collection,' said Courtney B. Wilson, executive director of the museum. 'Ed saved two significant pieces for the museum and, without his help, they would have been lost forever,' he said. 'In my opinion, he was a phenomenal Baltimorean. He was a quiet, unassuming and a very generous guy. The museum was his favorite place to come and he was always looking for ways to improve and enhance its collections,' Mr. Wilson said.

When the museum received No. 5300, it was then repainted in its original 1927 appearance which included: renumbering to 5300 from No.100, the dual-beam headlight swapped for a single beam Pyle National headlight, and the engine was repainted to the original B&O olive green and gold scheme with the Presidential series name, The President Washington, onto the cab. However, since the original B&O herald number plate was not with the engine when it left service, the number plate remained on the smokebox door. The locomotive also received another cosmetic repaint in 1981, and the curved coal bunker sides tender remains much as it was in service.

No. 5300 was initially put on static display at the museum in November 1968, and it subsequently spent the next thirty-seven years sitting outdoors alongside other locomotives, including No. 300 (which was renumbered to its original number, 4500), EMC EA No. 51, Chesapeake and Ohio 4-6-4 No. 490, and Reading 4-8-4 No. 2101. While being displayed outdoors, the locomotive would remain exposed to the elements and would cosmetically deteriorate.[10] In 2006, No. 5300 was put inside one of the museum's buildings to remain safe out of the elements and received a fresh repaint in its original olive green color. During the winter seasons, the locomotive has been temporarily re-lettered The Polar Express, to promote the Museum's Polar Express-themed excursion trains. On August 28, 2021, No. 5300 was removed from static display and towed to the museum's locomotive shop for cosmetic refurbishment. The cosmetic restoration will likely take over several years. The locomotive received a cosmetic restoration to its as-built appearance. Currently on static display at the Baltimore and Ohio Railroad Museum in Baltimore, Maryland, it is the only "Pacific" type locomotive built for the B&O to have been preserved.

== In fiction ==
The Class P7 also made appearances in Thomas & Friends as the engine Caitlin is based on the streamlined P-7a, more specifically engine No. 5304 “Royal Blue”.
