= Atlantic (locomotive) =

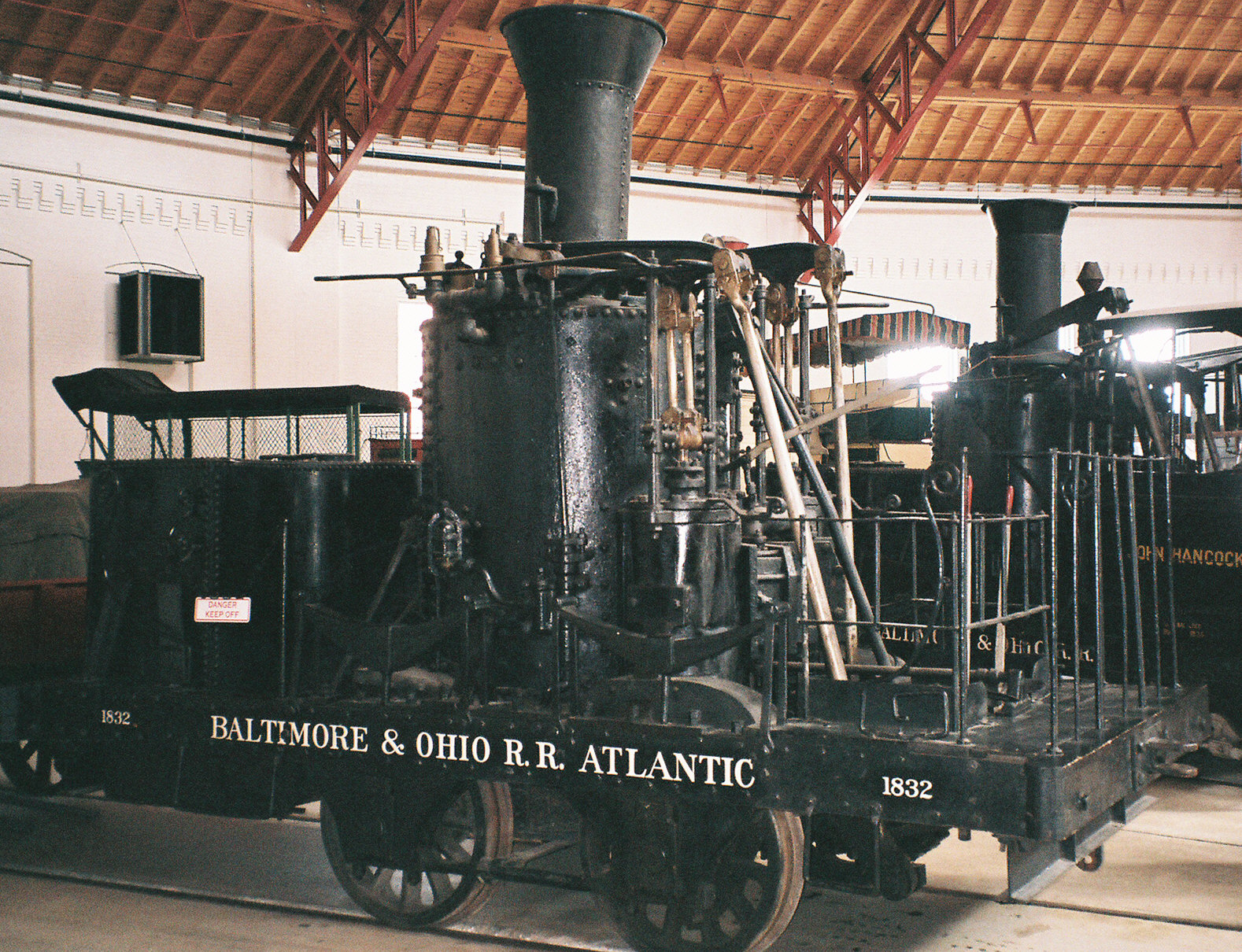
- The former Andrew Jackson, rebuilt to resemble the Atlantic, preserved on static display at the B&O Railroad Museum.
Type and origin
- Power type: Steam
- Builder: Phineas Davis
- Build date: 1832; 194 years ago (original) 1836 (replica)
Specifications
- Configuration
  - Whyte: 0-4-0VB
- Gauge: 4 ft 8 1/2 in (1,435 mm) standard gauge
- Loco weight: 6.5 short tons (5.9 t; 5.8 long tons)
- Fuel type: anthracite coal
- Boiler pressure: 50 psi (340 kPa)
- Cylinders: 2
Performance figures
- Power output: 63 hp (47 kW)
- Tractive effort: 1,570 lbf (7,000 N)
Career
- Operators: Baltimore and Ohio Railroad
- Nicknames: "Grasshopper"
- Retired: 1835
- Disposition: Original locomotive scrapped, similar locomotive made into replica

Atlantic was the name of a very early American steam locomotive built by inventor and foundry owner Phineas Davis for the Baltimore and Ohio Railroad (B&O) in 1832. It is in fact the first commercially successful and practical American built locomotive and class prototype, and Davis' second constructed for the B&O, his first having won a design competition announced by the B&O in 1830.

== Design and construction ==
Built at a cost of $4,500 (equal to $145,125 today), the Atlantic weighed 6.5 short tons (5.9 t; 5.8 long tons) and had two vertical cylinders. It was commissioned after Davis' entry had won the competition for a steam locomotive design, but the contract was awarded to the inventor of the Tom Thumb; when the five locomotives commissioned failed the contracted delivery, B&O bought out the patents. A few of these were incorporated in the Atlantic by Davis, whether by specification or because Davis wanted them is unclear. The locomotives he delivered before his death in 1835 were the first commercially feasible, sufficiently efficient coal burning steam locomotives produced domestically in the United States and placed into traction service. One of his engines, the John Quincy Adams, built in 1835, is the oldest existing American built locomotive. It is located at Carillon Historical Park in Dayton, Ohio.

Ox teams were used to convey the engine to Baltimore, where it made a successful inaugural trip to Ellicott's Mills, Maryland, a distance of thirteen miles (21 km). Nicknamed the 'Grasshopper' for its distinctive horizontal beam and long connecting rods, the locomotive carried 50 psi (345 kPa; 3.45 bar) of steam and burned one short ton (0.91 t; 0.89 long tons) of anthracite coal on a 40-mile (64 km) trip from Baltimore. Satisfied with this locomotive's operations, the B&O built 20 more locomotives of a similar design at its Mt. Clare shops in Baltimore. Despite this success, the Atlantic prototype engine was scrapped in 1835 after the death of Phineas Davis. The reason was unclear.

== The Atlantic replica ==
In 1892, four surviving similar Grasshopper engines were reconditioned for display. These locomotives, first built in 1836, were second generation Grasshoppers that had survived as shop switchers at the B&O's Mt. Clare shops. Major J. G. Pangborn took the No. 7 Andrew Jackson, built in 1836 by Ross Winans and George Gillingham, and rebuilt it to resemble the 1832 Atlantic, as a heritage showpiece. The side rods and cab on No. 7 were removed, but the larger boiler and cylinders remain. The former Andrew Jackson was first exhibited at the 1893 World's Columbian Exposition in Chicago, Illinois, operated for the B&O 1927 Centenary Pageant "Fair of the Iron Horse", and then exhibited again at the 1939 New York World's Fair, and finally in 1948-49 at the Chicago Railroad Fair as part of the latter fair's "Wheels A-Rolling" pageant. It was later placed on display in the Baltimore and Ohio Railroad Museum, where it currently remains.
