= Little Joe (Baltimore and Ohio locomotive) =

Class of American steam locomotives

B&O class C-16
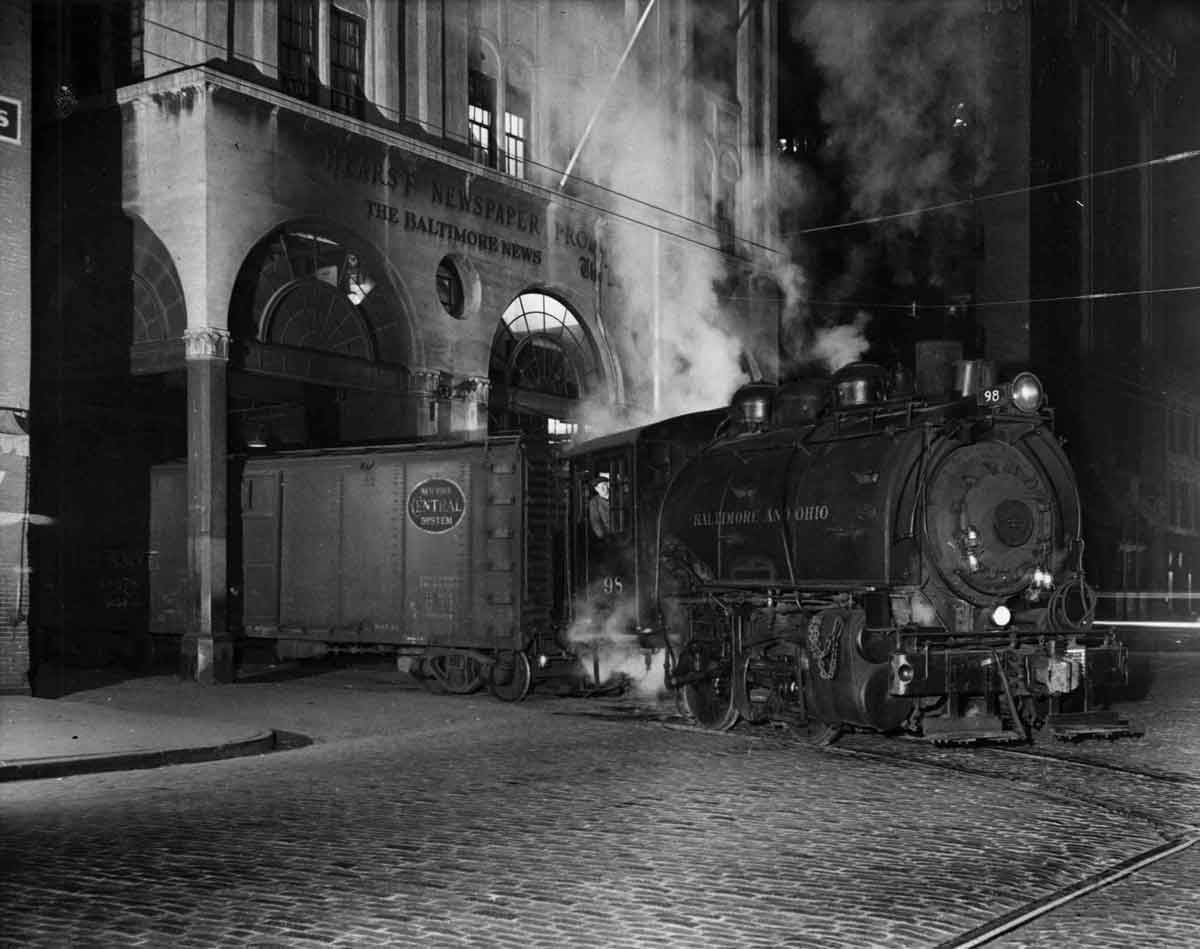
Type and origin
- Power type: Steam
- Builder: Baldwin Locomotive Works
- Build date: 1912
- Total produced: 4
Specifications
- Configuration
  - Whyte: 0-4-0ST
  - UIC: B
- Gauge: 4 ft 8 1/2 in (1,435 mm) standard gauge
- Driver dia.: 46 in (1.168 m)
- Loco weight: 120,000 lb (54,000 kg; 54 t)
- Boiler pressure: 180 psi (1.2 MPa)
- Cylinder size: 19 in × 24 in (483 mm × 610 mm)
- Valve gear: Walschaerts
Performance figures
- Tractive effort: 27,617 lbf (122.85 kN)
Career
- Operators: Baltimore and Ohio Railroad
- Class: C-16
- Numbers: 96-99
- Nicknames: "Little Joe", "Dockside"
- Disposition: All scrapped

The C-16 class switchers were the last 0-4-0 steam locomotives built for the Baltimore and Ohio Railroad. They were assigned to the Baltimore, Maryland "Pratt Street Line" along the Inner Harbor, and to the Philadelphia, Pennsylvania waterfront trackage. Initially constructed as saddle tank engines, nos. 96 and 99 were given tenders in later years. After the saddle tank was removed in 1926 they were then given the classification of "C-16A" (Nos. 97 and 98 remained unchanged). Their small size and short wheelbase were required to handle the lines' tight curves. No. 99 was scrapped in 1944. No. 97 was renumbered 897 in 1950 and scrapped in 1951. No. 98 was renumbered 898 in 1950 and also scrapped in 1951.

Nicknamed "Little Joe" by railroad workers, they became well known to several generations of model railroad enthusiasts through construction of N, HO, S & O scale models of the "Dockside" switcher. These locomotive models gained significant notoriety for half a century, versions of the C-16 have been offered by Varney, Rivarossi, Gem, Life-Like, Pacific Fast Mail, MTH, Bachmann and others. They were also used as a model for Trainz Railroad Simulator.

They are not to be confused with the unrelated electric locomotives also nicknamed "Little Joe".
