= J.O.E. =

- Also known as: Lil Joe
- Born: Alty George Nunes III; 14 July 1986; Kingston, Jamaica
- Died: 7 February 2011 (aged 24) Mona, Jamaica
- Genres: Reggae
- Years active: 1990s–2011

Alty George Nunes III (14 July 1986 – 7 February 2011), better known by his stage name J.O.E., and previously as Lil Joe, was a Jamaican reggae singer.

== Biography ==
From Kingston's Vineyard Town area, Nunes was the son of Alty George Nunes and Patsy Ricketts, the principal dancer of the National Dance Theatre Company, and studied at Wolmer's Boys High School.

Known for his 'conscious' lyrics, Nunes was a member of the Twelve Tribes of Israel. He was a member of the group Jah Children in the 1990s, who toured Europe before splitting up. He placed third in the JCDC's Festival Song Contest in 2005 with "Don't Leave". He was originally known as 'Lil Joe', and worked with producers such as Gussie Clarke, with whom he recorded one of his best known songs, "Not Good at All". He adopted the name 'J.O.E.' (Jah Ova Evil) after suffering a ruptured cerebral aneurysm in November 2009 which saw him hospitalised for three weeks.

He died on 7 February 2011 at the University Hospital of the West Indies in Mona from a second ruptured cerebral aneurysm, aged 24.

His debut album, Man From Judah, was completed after his death, with contributions from T.O.K., Konshens, Krayzie Bone, and Ky-Mani Marley, and released in July 2012.

== Discography ==
- Man From Judah (2012)
