= Tom Thumb (locomotive) =

1830 American-built steam locomotive

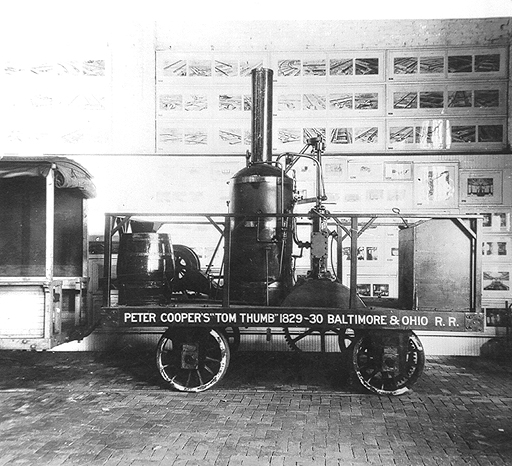
- A 1927 replica of Tom Thumb, the first American-built steam locomotive
Type and origin
- Power type: Steam
- Builder: Peter Cooper
- Build date: 1829; 197 years ago
Specifications
- Configuration
  - Whyte: 2-2-0VB
- Length: 13 ft 2 3/4 in (4.03 m)
- Height: 12 ft 9 in (3.89 m)
- Fuel type: Anthracite coal
- Boiler: 27 in × 66 in (690 mm × 1,680 mm); Diameter × Height
- Cylinder size: 5 in × 27 in (127 mm × 686 mm); Bore × Stroke
Performance figures
- Power output: 1.4 hp (1.0 kW)
Career
- Operators: Baltimore and Ohio Railroad

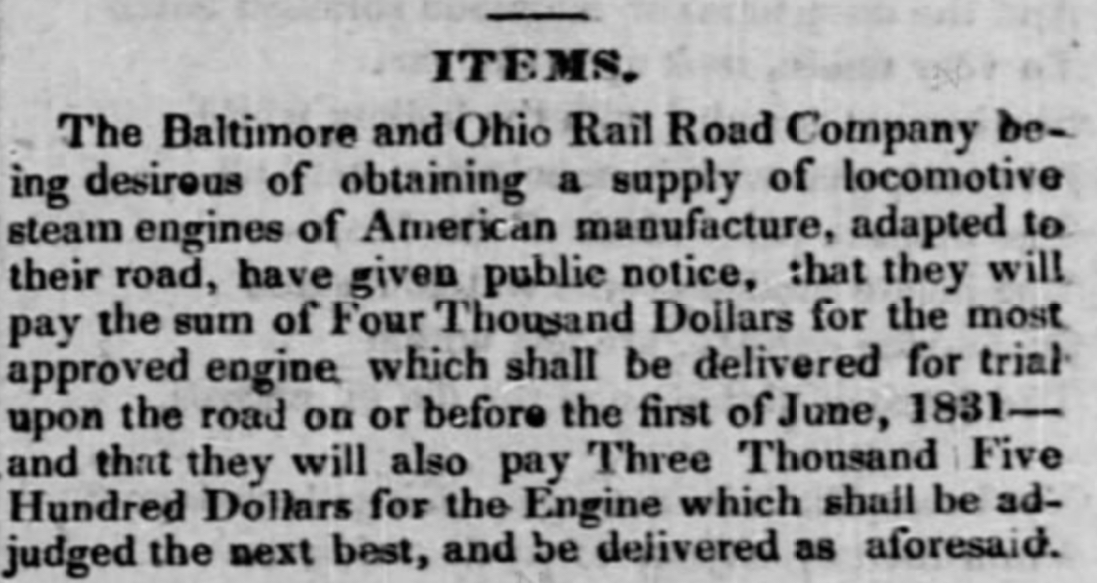
Locomotives sought by the Baltimore and Ohio Railroad, 1831

Tom Thumb was the first American-built steam locomotive to operate on a common-carrier railroad. It was designed and constructed by Peter Cooper in 1829 to convince owners of the newly formed Baltimore and Ohio Railroad (B&O) (later CSX) to use steam engines; it was not intended to enter revenue service. It is especially remembered as a participant in a race with a horse-drawn car, which the horse won after Tom Thumb suffered a mechanical failure. (See Relay, Maryland.) However, the demonstration was successful, and the railroad committed to the use of steam locomotion and held trials in the following year for a working engine.

== Background ==
The first railroads were little more than tracks on roads; horses pulled wagons and carriages with their wheels modified to ride on the rails. Trains could not be moved by steam power until the steam engine could be mounted on wheels. The first steam locomotives were built in England, and the first locomotives in America, such as Stourbridge Lion, were imported from England. Soon however, Americans began to plan their own locomotives.

== Design and construction ==
Tom Thumb was designed by Peter Cooper as a four-wheel locomotive with a vertical boiler and vertically mounted cylinders that drove the wheels on one of the axles. The "design" was characterized by a host of improvisations. The boiler tubes were made from rifle barrels and a blower was mounted in the stack, driven by a belt to the powered axle. The engine was fueled by anthracite coal.

Cooper's interest in the railroad was by way of substantial real estate investment in the Canton neighborhood of Baltimore. Success for the railroad was expected to increase the value of his holdings.

Construction was carried out in the machine shop of George W. Johnson, where the 18-year-old James Millholland was apprenticed. Millholland would later become a prominent locomotive designer in his own right.

== Demonstration ==
Testing was performed on the first section, built in 1829, of the company's future main track line to Wheeling, Virginia (now West Virginia). The first section linked Baltimore and Ellicott Mills (now Ellicott City, Maryland), along the upper branch of the Patapsco River Valley. Cars were pulled by horses. Two tracks had been constructed, which led the owners of Stockton and Company, a local stagecoach line providing passenger and freight service, to challenge the new locomotive to a race over the 8 miles (13 km) between the Relay House and Baltimore. It is probable that the race took place on August 28, 1830, although other sources report dates of August 25 and September 28.

The challenge accepted, Tom Thumb was easily able to pull away from the horse until the belt slipped off the blower pulley. Without the blower, the boiler did not draw adequately and the locomotive lost power, allowing the horse to pass and win the race. Nonetheless, it was recognized that the locomotive offered superior performance. The B&O stopped using horses in 1831.

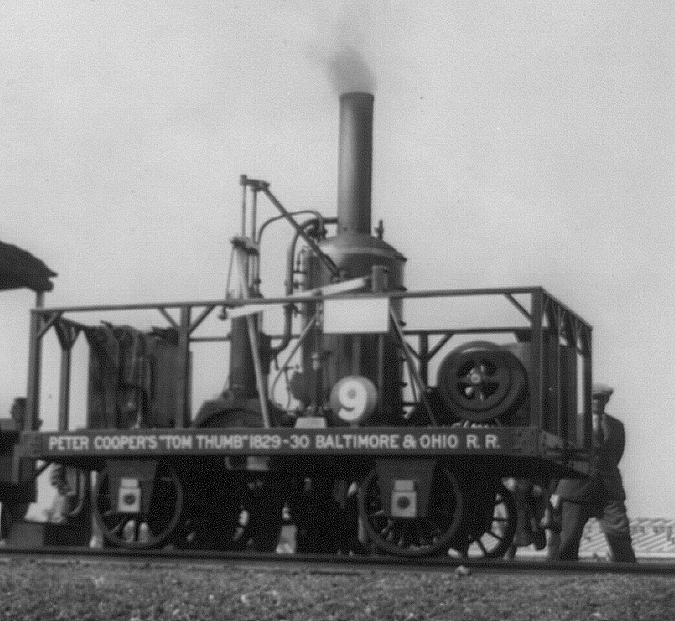
The Tom Thumb replica in action.

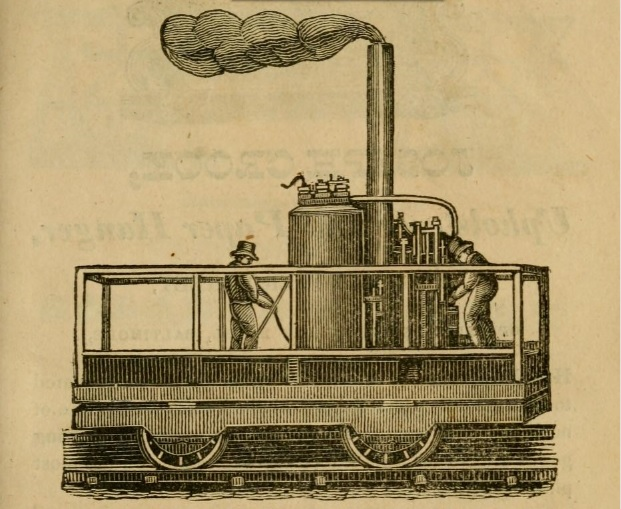
1831 drawing of a locomotive (likely the Tom Thumb) in Baltimore.

== Aftermath ==
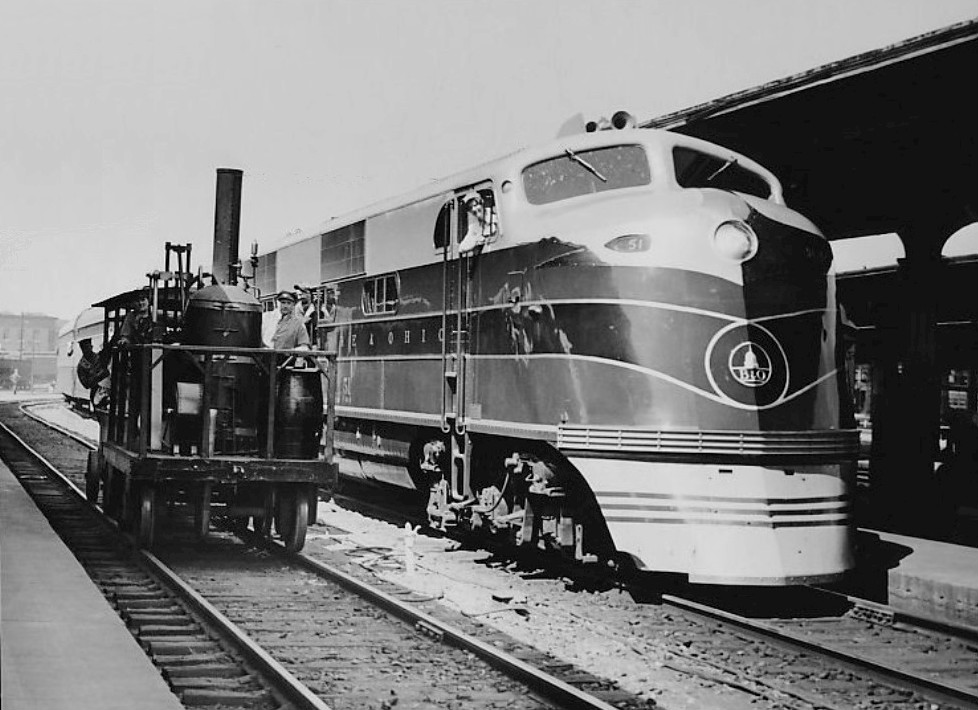
Tom Thumb replica alongside B&O EMC EA/EB #51, 1937. Both locomotives are on display at the National Museum of Railroad History & Innovation in Baltimore.

Because Tom Thumb was not intended for revenue service, the locomotive was not preserved. Cooper and others associated with the railroad's early days left detailed descriptions, though, which enabled the general dimensions and appearance to be worked out. In 1892, a wooden model was constructed by Major Joseph Pangborn, a western newspaperman and publicist, who also had models made of many other early locomotives. In 1927 the B&O hosted a centennial exhibition near Baltimore, titled "Fair of the Iron Horse", and had a replica constructed for the exhibition. This replica followed Pangborn's model and therefore differed considerably from the original, being somewhat larger and heavier, and considerably taller (note that the dimensions given above are those of the replica). Also, instead of the blower in the stack, a much larger blower was mounted on the platform to provide a forced draft, and the support frame of the cylinder and guides was considerably different.

The replica remains on display at the National Museum of Railroad History & Innovation. The museum lists the replica as "operational", and the locomotive makes special appearances each year.

A working half-scale model of Tom Thumb is currently on display and being demonstrated to visitors at the Hesston Steam Museum in La Porte, Indiana.

== See also ==
- Baltimore and Ohio Railroad
- Baltimore, Maryland
- Best Friend of Charleston
- History of rail transport in the United States
- John Bull
