= Orange Grove, Maryland =

- Location of Orange Grove, Maryland
- Coordinates: 39°14′28″N 76°44′58″W
- Country: United States
- State: Maryland
- County: Howard
- Time zone: UTC−5 (Eastern (EST))
  - Summer (DST): UTC−4 (EDT)

Orange Grove was a town straddling the Patapsco River in Howard County and Baltimore County, Maryland, United States.

The Orange Grove area was the site of two parallel roads running along the Patapsco River settled by the Elliotts in 1762. The road to then North was referred to as "George Washington's Gun Road" as the path of General Lafayette's troops en route to the Siege of Yorktown. In 1856, the land was sold by George Elliot for $9,000 to George Worthington and George Baily. They started a construction of a six-story mill and sold the property to C.A Gambrill for $45,000. The Gamrill Mill was renamed to Orange Grove producing "Patpasco Superlative Patent" and "Orange Grove" flour. Citizens lived on the Howard County side, using a rope bridge to travel to the mill and B&O railroad siding. In 1869, the mill was purchased by R.G. and P.H. MacGill keeping the name C.A. Gambill & Company, who added steam power in 1873 and modern rollers in 1879. In 1898, the Orange Grove school opened. In 1904, ice stacked up, tearing down the bridge. The same year, the company-owned Phoenix Mill burned in the Great Baltimore Fire. On 6 May 1905, the mill and train station burned in a fire started in the engine room monitored by George W. Carr. The town did not recover, and the ruins are part of the Patapsco Valley State Park with a modern suspended bridge along the trail.

== See also ==
- Orange Grove Flour Mill
- Patapsco Swinging Bridge
