= Baltimore Bridge =

Baltimore Bridge could refer to any of several bridges in the Baltimore area of Maryland.

== In Baltimore, the independent city ==
- Carrollton Viaduct (built 1829), a railway bridge over Gwynns Falls
- Francis Scott Key Bridge (Baltimore) (built 1977), carried the I-695 Toll over the Patapsco River and the outer Baltimore Harbor
  - Francis Scott Key Bridge collapse, its collapse in March 2024
- Hanover Street Bridge (officially the Vietnam Veterans Memorial Bridge, built 1916), carrying state highway Maryland Route 2
- Interstate 395 (Maryland) (or Cal Ripken Way, built 1981), which has an elevated T interchange over the Middle Branch of the Patapsco River
- Lombard Street Bridge (1877–1974), over Gwynns Falls

== In Baltimore County ==
- Carrollton Viaduct (built 1829), a railway bridge over Gwynns Falls
- Curtis Creek Drawbridge, over Curtis Creek
- Jericho Covered Bridge (built 1865), over Little Gunpowder Falls
- Patapsco Swinging Bridge (built late 1800s), over the Patapsco River, in Patapsco Valley State Park
- Patterson Viaduct (1829–1868), a ruined railway bridge
- Thomas Viaduct (built 1835), a railway bridge over the Patapsco River
