= Seamen's haven =

Social welfare organization

A seamen's haven is a social welfare organization for sailors, often operated by Christian churches or missionaries. Havens were most prominent in North American port cities in the 19th and 20th centuries. They were widely used during the Great Depression and declined in popularity afterward. Some provide comprehensive social services such as food and shelter, while others are mainly social organizations.

== Canada ==
From 1944 until 2002, a haven operated as a social club and mission for sailors visiting Port Alberni, British Columbia. The sailors worked on ships that came to Port Alberni to load lumber and pulp and paper that was shipped to international markets.

Similar havens were chartered in Victoria, Vancouver, Toronto, Quebec and Sydney, Nova Scotia, under one Canadian headquarters in Toronto. A number of Canadian havens were affiliated with the Sailors' Society.

== Hong Kong ==
A haven called the Mariner's Club was established in 1975 near the Kwai Chung container terminal in Hong Kong.

== Israel ==
A haven operated by the Norwegian Church Abroad in Haifa had been operating for 15 years as of 1964. Among other programs, it set up tours of Jerusalem and other attractions in Israel.

== United States ==
The Federal Transient Service, a New Deal program, operated at least one seamen's haven in the Boston area, which aroused some controversy in the community given the possibility of non-citizen sailors using federal funds for housing. The Boston Seaman's Friend Society, a seamen's haven in Boston's North End, was founded in 1834 and saw particularly heavy use as a shelter and meal center as of 1934.

The Seamen's Church Institute of New York and New Jersey, a seamen's haven in Port Newark, has also operated since 1834. In 1942, a Long Island couple, renovated their home to serve as a seamen's haven.

The Federal Transient Service also built a haven at Timm's Point in San Pedro, Los Angeles in 1934 as a homeless shelter for sailors.

In 1942, the government of Maryland converted a camp for conscientious objectors in what is now Patapsco Valley State Park into a seamen's haven.
