= Grist Mill Trail =

Trail in Baltimore County, Maryland

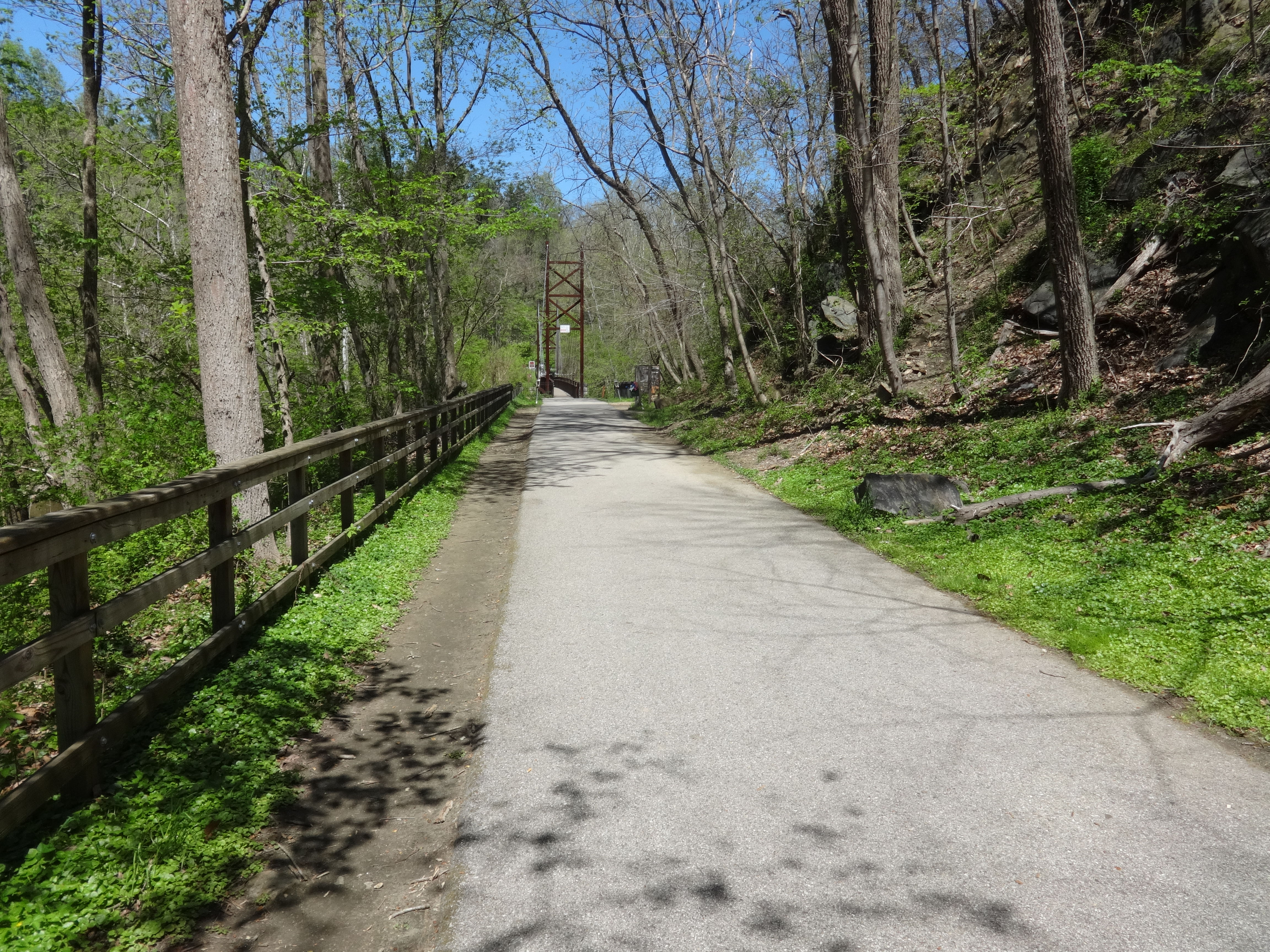
- Length: 5 mi (8.0 km)
- Location: Patapsco Valley State Park
- Established: 2003
- Trailheads: Lost Lake 39.23065°N 76.72950°W; Ilchester Road 39.24955°N 76.76490°W
- Use: Walking, jogging, biking
- Difficulty: Easy, level, ADA accessible
- Season: Year-round
- Months: Year-round
- Sights: Patapsco Swinging Bridge
- Surface: Asphalt

The Grist Mill Trail is a 5.0 mile long hiking and biking trail located in Patapsco Valley State Park in the Baltimore County side of the Patapsco Valley near Catonsville, Maryland. The paved pathway runs parallel to the Baltimore and Ohio Railroad to the north, and the Patapsco River to the south.

The original segment of the path connected the Lost Lake to the Patapsco Swinging Bridge in the Avalon area of the park. In 2006, the trail was expanded to Ilchester Road, where a second swinging bridge was built atop the remains of the Patterson Viaduct. All together, the Grist Mill Trail travels from River Road in Relay, Maryland to Ilchester Road/River Road in Ellicott City, Maryland.
