= Orange Grove Flour Mill =

Mill near Ellicott City, Maryland, US

Coordinates: 39.241159°N 76.74968°W

The Orange Grove Flour Mill was a flour mill established in 1856. It was one of the leading flour mills in the Mid-Atlantic states until it was destroyed in a fire in 1905.

== History ==
The Mill was established in 1856 by a partnership of Dailey and Worthington. It was originally one of many flour mills and other industries built along the river near Ellicott City. In 1860, the mill with a production of 500 barrels a day was sold to Charles A. Gambrill Esq. It was one of the only structures not badly damaged by a flood on 24 July 1868, and was back online in mid August. It quickly became the leading flour manufacturer in the area, though the flood did also lead to a general period of decline in the area, a former Mid-Atlantic leader in manufacturing. For a time, Orange Grove Flour Mill was the largest flour mill east of Minneapolis. While the five story mill was owned by the C.A. Gambrill Manufacturing Company, it produced a peak between 1,200 and 1,500 barrels of flour daily. In 1905, the mill burned down in a fire, and was never rebuilt. Orange Grove Flour was sold in string tied white bags that were labeled "Patapsco Superlative Flour."

== Current condition ==
Today, only ruins from the mill remain, which are visible next to the rebuilt Patapsco Swinging Bridge. which was originally constructed to allow mill employees to cross the Patapsco River from the Howard County to the Baltimore County side to work. After Hurricane Agnes in 1972, the Mill ruins were largely destroyed. Today, all that is visible is part of the Mill's retaining wall and a piece of a former coal chute for trains.

== Location ==
The ruins of the Orange Grove Mill are located between the CSX Railroad tracks and Grist Mill Trail in the Orange Grove Area of Patapsco Valley State Park. The Mill ruins are located near the middle of the trail about 1 1/3 miles from the trail entrance at Lost Lake, and about 1 mile from the trail entrance at Ilchester Road, near Bloede's Dam. The ruins are also accessible via an unmarked rocky trail that runs down to the park from the entrance of the All Saints Convent on Hilton Avenue in Catonsville, MD.
