= Patapsco Vallis =

Vallis on Mars

- Patapsco Vallis, as seen by HiRISE. Scale bar is 1000 meters long.
- Coordinates: 24°N 207°W

Patapsco Vallis is a valley in the Elysium quadrangle of Mars, located at 24° N and 207° West. It is 153 km long and was named after a modern river in Maryland, United States.
