= Herbert Run =

Location
- Country: United States
- State: Maryland
- County: Baltimore County

Physical characteristics
- Mouth
  - location: Patapsco River
  - coordinates: 39°13′15″N 76°41′24″W
  - elevation: 5 feet (1.5 m)
- Length: .413 mi (0.665 km)

Basin features
- River system: Patapsco River

Herbert Run is a .413-mile-long (0.665 km) stream that flows through Baltimore County. It is a tributary of the Patapsco River, which flows into the Chesapeake Bay.

Herbert Run divides into two tributaries, East Branch Herbert Run and West Branch Herbert Run, to the north. The headwaters of the East Branch are located near the Banneker Community Center in the neighborhood of Catonsville. The headwaters of the West Branch are located near Spring Grove Hospital Center in Catonsville.

== See also ==
- List of Maryland rivers
