= Curtis Creek =

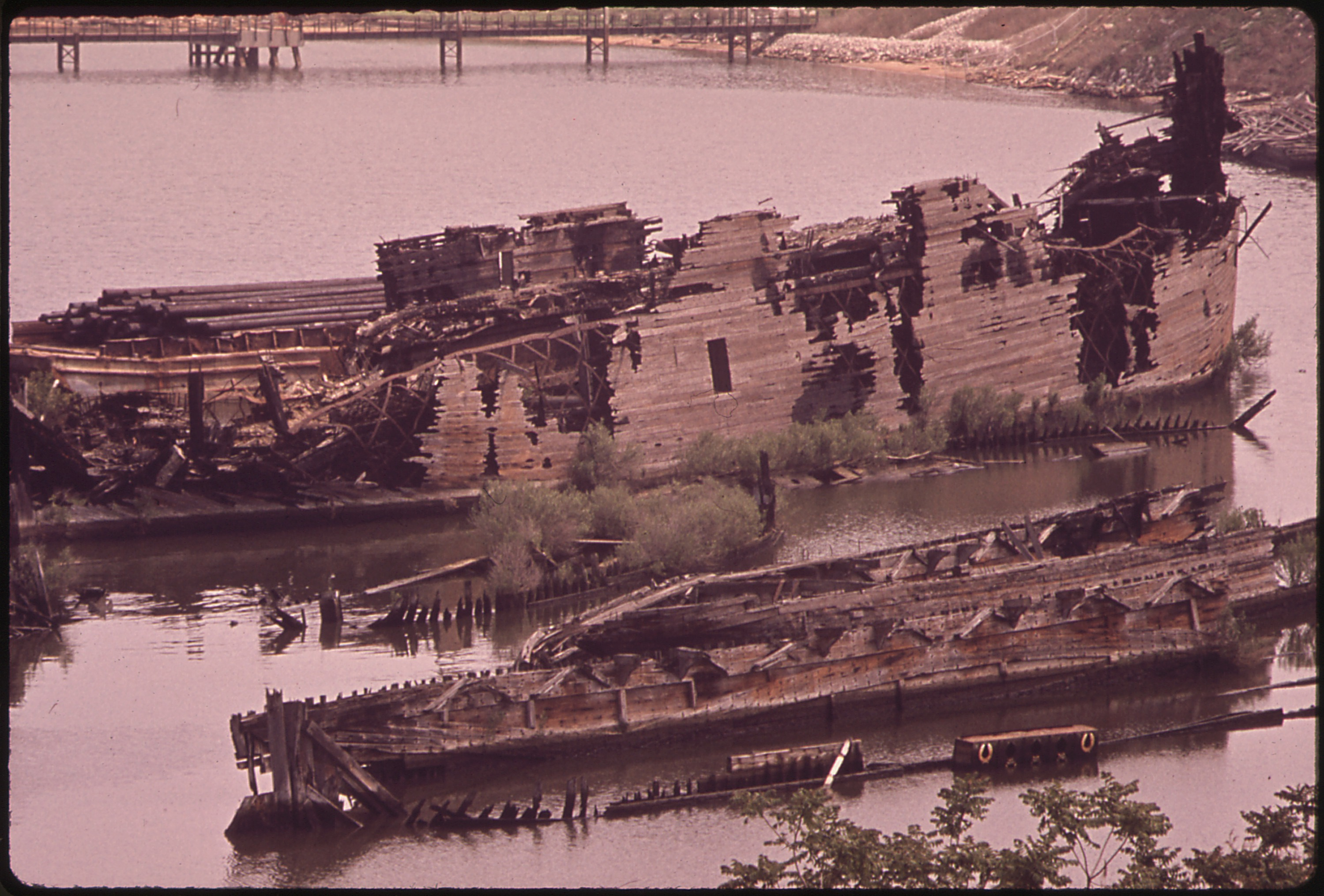

Location
- Country: United States
- State: Maryland
- District: Baltimore City; Anne Arundel County

Physical characteristics
- Source
  - coordinates: 39°11′11″N 76°34′43″W
  - elevation: 0 ft (0 m)
- Mouth: Curtis Bay
  - coordinates: 39°13′10″N 76°34′27″W
  - elevation: 0 ft (0 m)

Curtis Creek is a tidal creek located in Baltimore City and Anne Arundel County, Maryland. It is a tributary of the cove Curtis Bay and is adjacent to the west of the South Baltimore community of Curtis Bay. The creek begins at the confluence of Furnace Creek and Marley Creek in northern Anne Arundel County, Maryland. It flows north about 2.5 miles (4.0 km) into Curtis Bay (which now lies in the City of Baltimore) which opens to the east into the main branch and stem of the Patapsco River (serving as the Port of Baltimore) and the Chesapeake Bay.

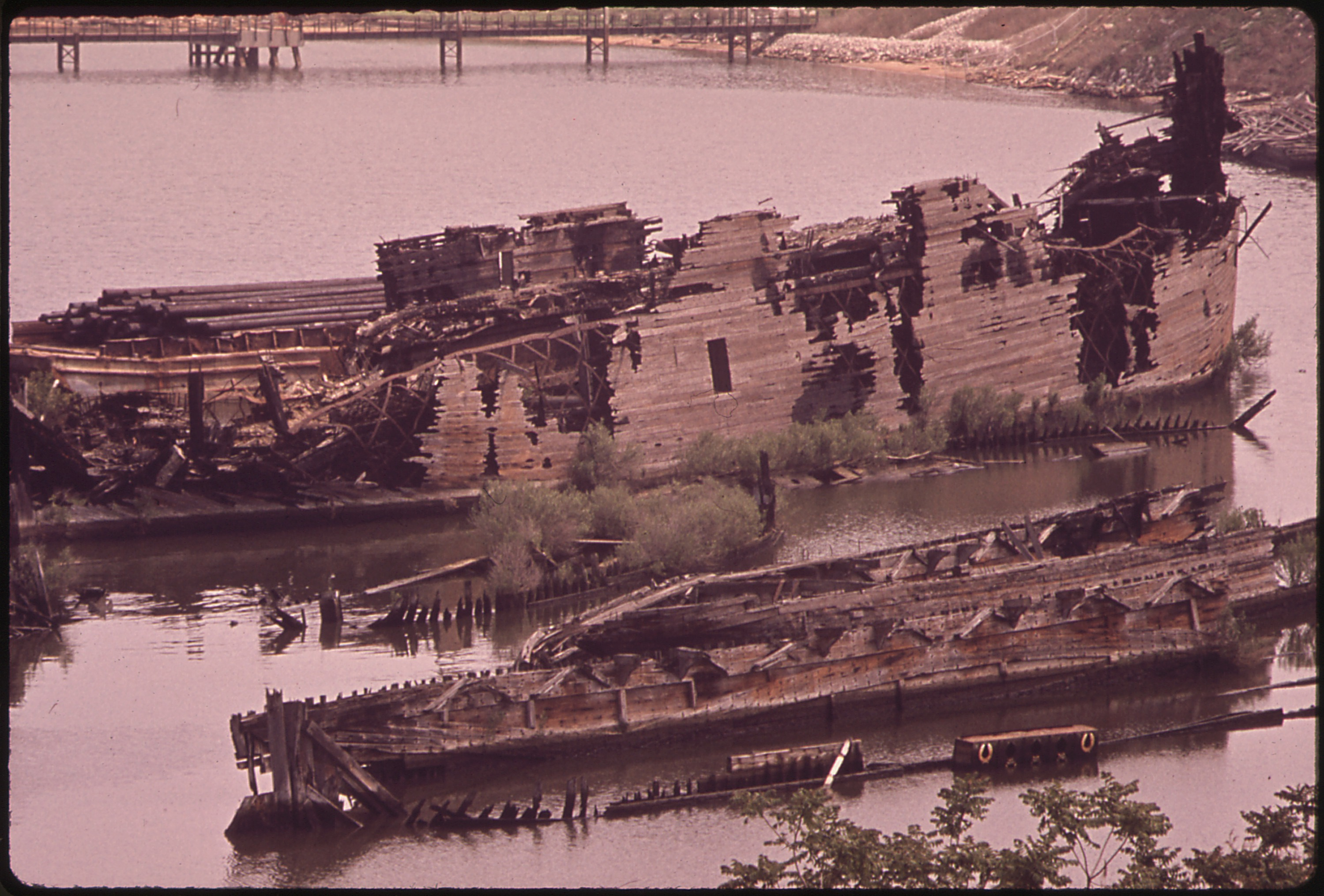
Abandoned boats in Curtis Creek, off the community of Curtis Bay, 1973
