= Patterson Viaduct =

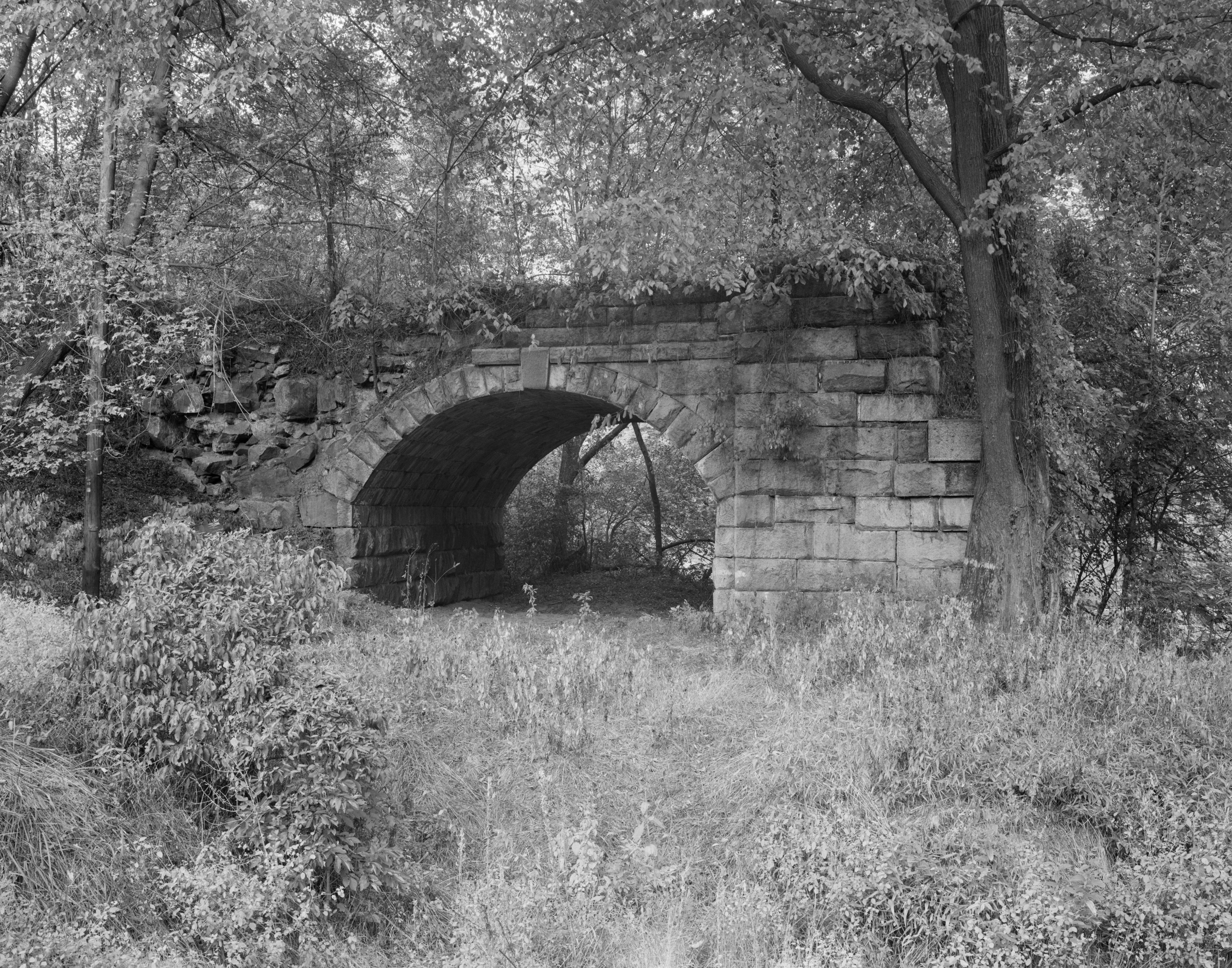
- Patterson Viaduct Ruins, 1970
- Coordinates: 39.248889°N 76.764722°W
- Patterson Viaduct Ruins
- U.S. National Register of Historic Places
- Location within Maryland Location within the United States
- Nearest city: Ilchester, Maryland
- Area: 2 acres (0.81 ha)
- Built: 1829
- Built by: Wever, Caspar; McCartney, John
- Architectural style: Masonry Arch Bridge
- NRHP reference No.: 76002221
- Added to NRHP: June 3, 1976
- Crosses: Patapsco River (before 1868)
- Locale: Ilchester, Maryland
- Official name: Patterson Viaduct

Characteristics
- Design: Arch bridge
- Total length: 360 feet (110 m)
- Longest span: 55 feet (17 m)
- Clearance below: 43 feet (13 m)

History
- Opened: December 1829
- Closed: 1868

Location
- Interactive map of Patterson Viaduct

The Patterson Viaduct was built by the Baltimore and Ohio Railroad (B&O) as part of its Old Main Line during May to December 1829. The viaduct spanned the Patapsco River at Ilchester, Maryland. It was heavily damaged by a flood in 1868 and subsequently replaced with other structures. In 2006, it was restored to limited service when a footbridge was built atop the surviving arch and abutments.

== History and design ==
=== Original bridge ===
The Patterson Viaduct was one of three (along with the Carrollton Viaduct and Oliver Viaduct) constructed for the first phase of the railroad, which ran 13 miles (21 km) between Baltimore and Ellicott's Mills (today's Ellicott City). Similar in construction to the Carrollton Viaduct, the Patterson Viaduct was named for B&O director and well known civic leader and merchant William Patterson, who also donated land for Patterson Park in east Baltimore. It was designed by Caspar Wever and built under the supervision of John McCartney, one of Wever's assistants. McCartney's good work on the Patterson Viaduct was later rewarded with the contract to build the longer curving Thomas Viaduct downstream over the Patapsco at Relay in 1833–1835.

Constructed of granite blocks, the viaduct was about 360 feet (110 m) long, rising about 43 ft (13 m) above its foundations. It had four graduated arches: two of 55 ft (17 m) chord length each and two of 20 ft (6.1 m) chord length each. The two smaller side arches allowed the passage of two county roadways, one on each side of the river. The exterior surfaces of the granite blocks were rusticated.

Patterson ceremonially opened the viaduct on December 4, 1829, a year and a half after construction began on the line, the first in America. In 1830, the viaduct was part of the route used by the B&O's first horse-drawn carriage train to Ellicott's Mills inaugurating railway traffic.

=== Second bridge ===
The viaduct was almost totally destroyed in 1868 by a massive flood that devastated and wiped out numerous stone mills and industrial structures along the river. In 1869, it was replaced by a single-span Bollman truss of cast and wrought iron by Wendel Bollman, reusing the original roadway arch and upstream wing wall of the west abutment.

In 1903, the Bollman truss was supplanted when the track was moved to a new bridge and alignment about 400 ft (120 m) upstream with the opening of the Ilchester Tunnel.

=== Third bridge ===
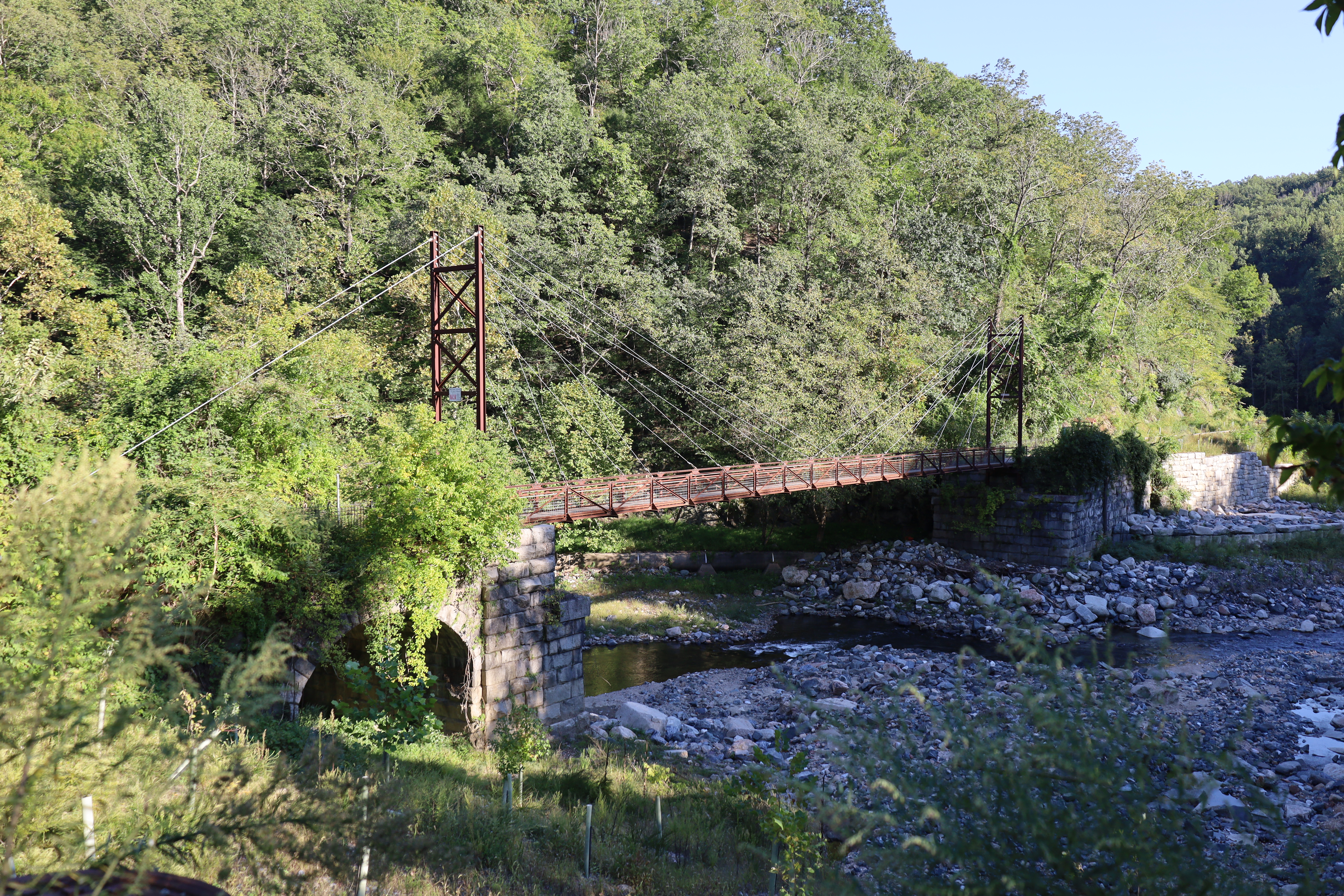
The new footbridge

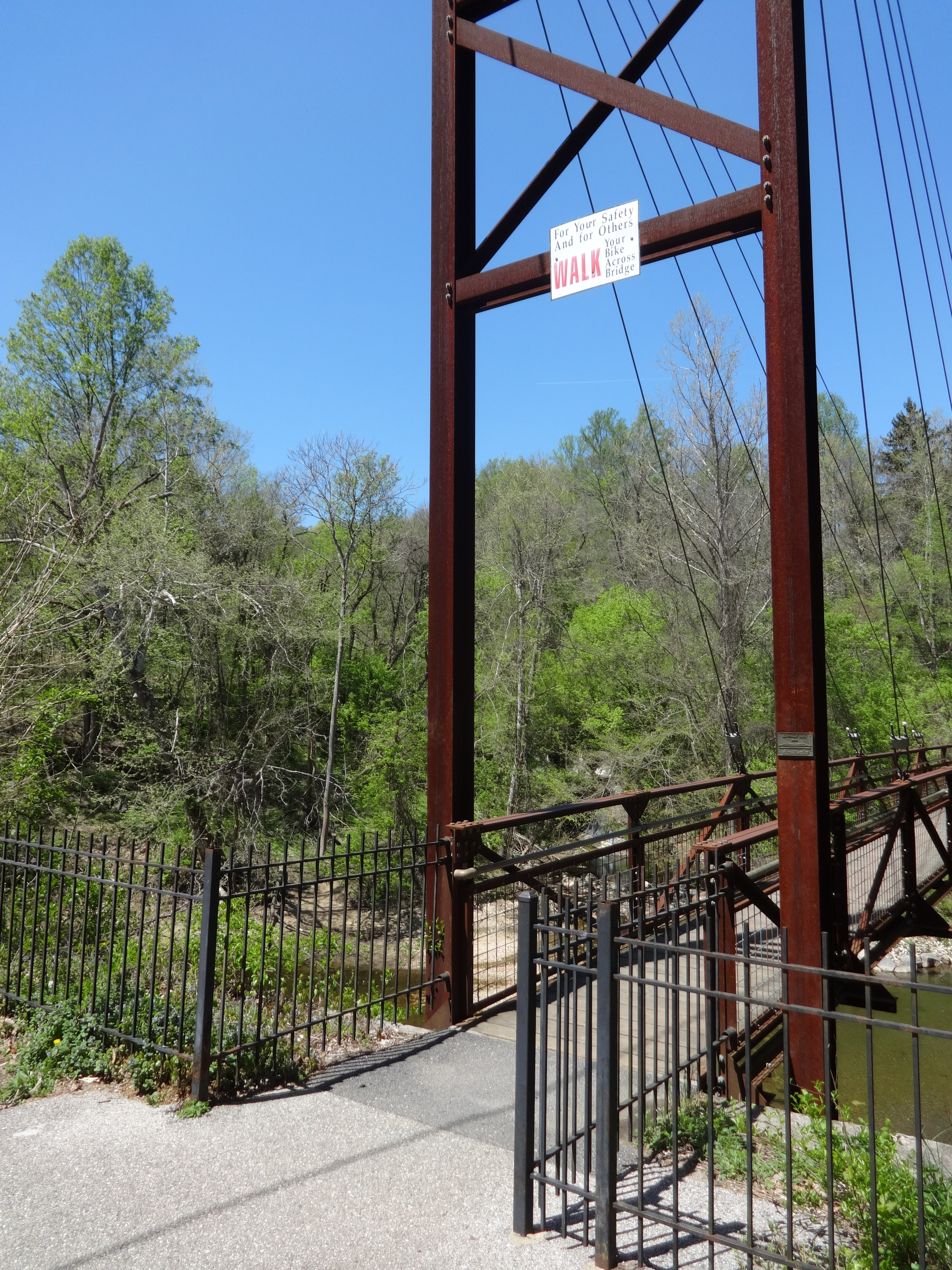
The 2006 footbridge built on the original abutments

Today, all that remains of the original 1829 viaduct is the single arch that spanned the roadway on the west bank and the abutment on the east bank. The ruins were listed on the National Register of Historic Places on June 3, 1976. In 2006, a cable-stayed footbridge carrying the Grist Mill Trail, with a design that echoes the historic architecture and engineering of a Bollman Bridge, was added atop the abutments.

== See also ==
- List of Howard County properties in the Maryland Historical Trust
- List of bridges documented by the Historic American Engineering Record in Maryland
- List of tunnels documented by the Historic American Engineering Record in Maryland
- List of bridges on the National Register of Historic Places in Maryland
