= Patapsco River =

River in Maryland, United States

Patapsco River The River of History
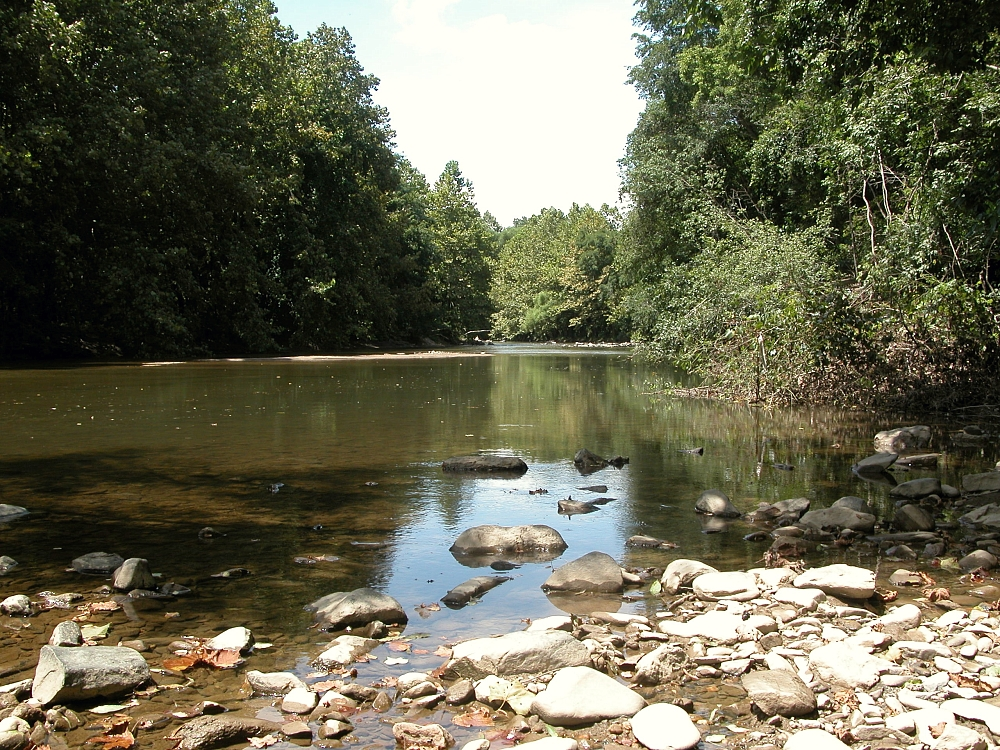
- Patapsco Valley State Park at Catonsville

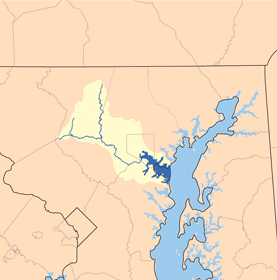
- Patapsco River Watershed
- Native name: Potapskut (Algonquian languages)

Location
- Country: United States
- State: Maryland
- Region: Baltimore metropolitan area, Patapsco Valley
- Cities: Baltimore, Elkridge, Ellicott City

Physical characteristics
- Source
  - location: Parr's Spring
  - coordinates: 39°21′16″N 77°10′4″W
  - elevation: 260 ft (79 m)
- Mouth: Chesapeake Bay
  - location: Baltimore
  - coordinates: 39°10′48″N 76°26′24″W
  - elevation: 0 ft (0 m)
- Length: 63 km (39 mi)
- Basin size: 950 sq mi (2,460 km^{2})

Basin features
- Tributaries
  - left: North Branch
  - right: South Branch

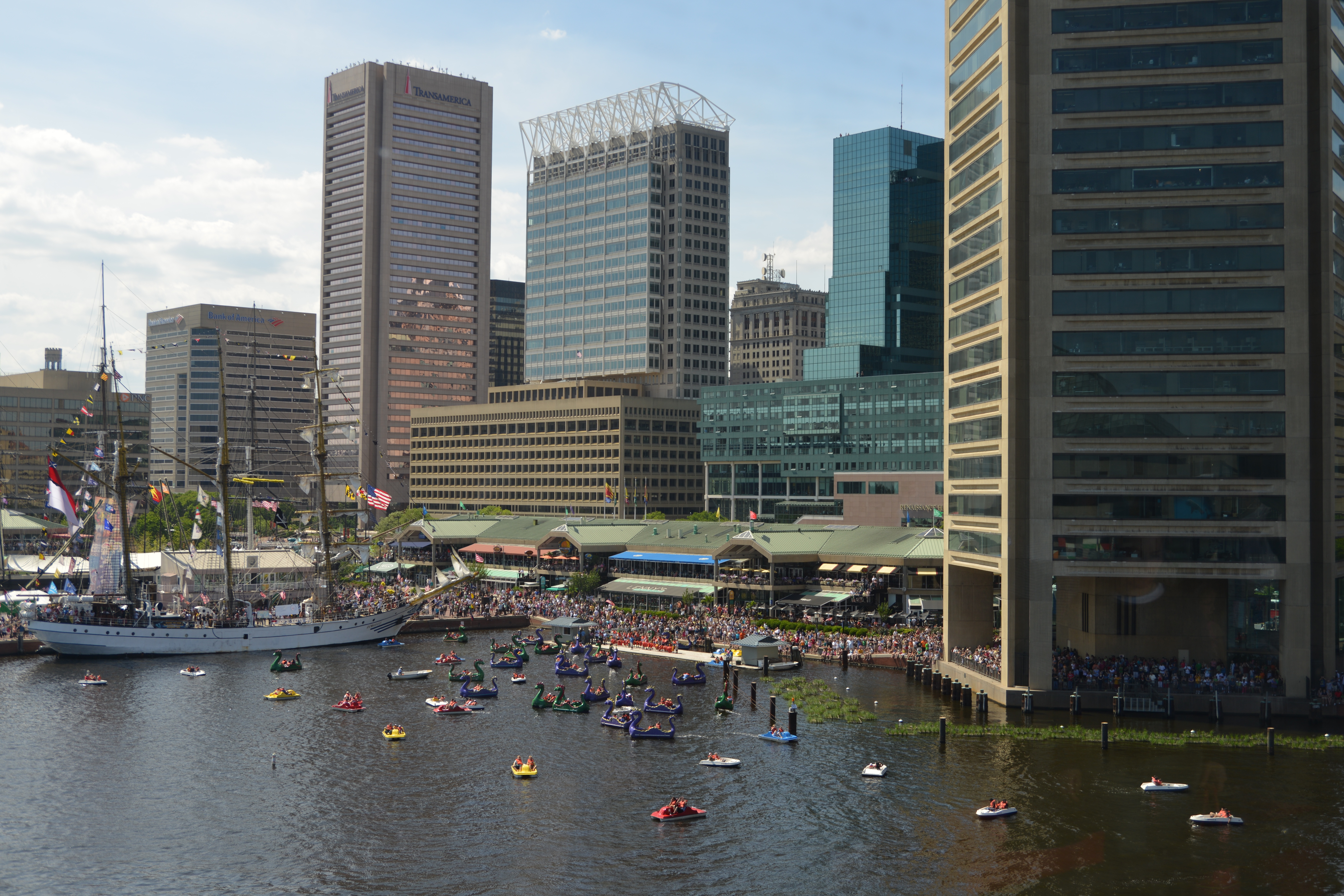
The Inner Harbor viewed from the Baltimore Aquarium

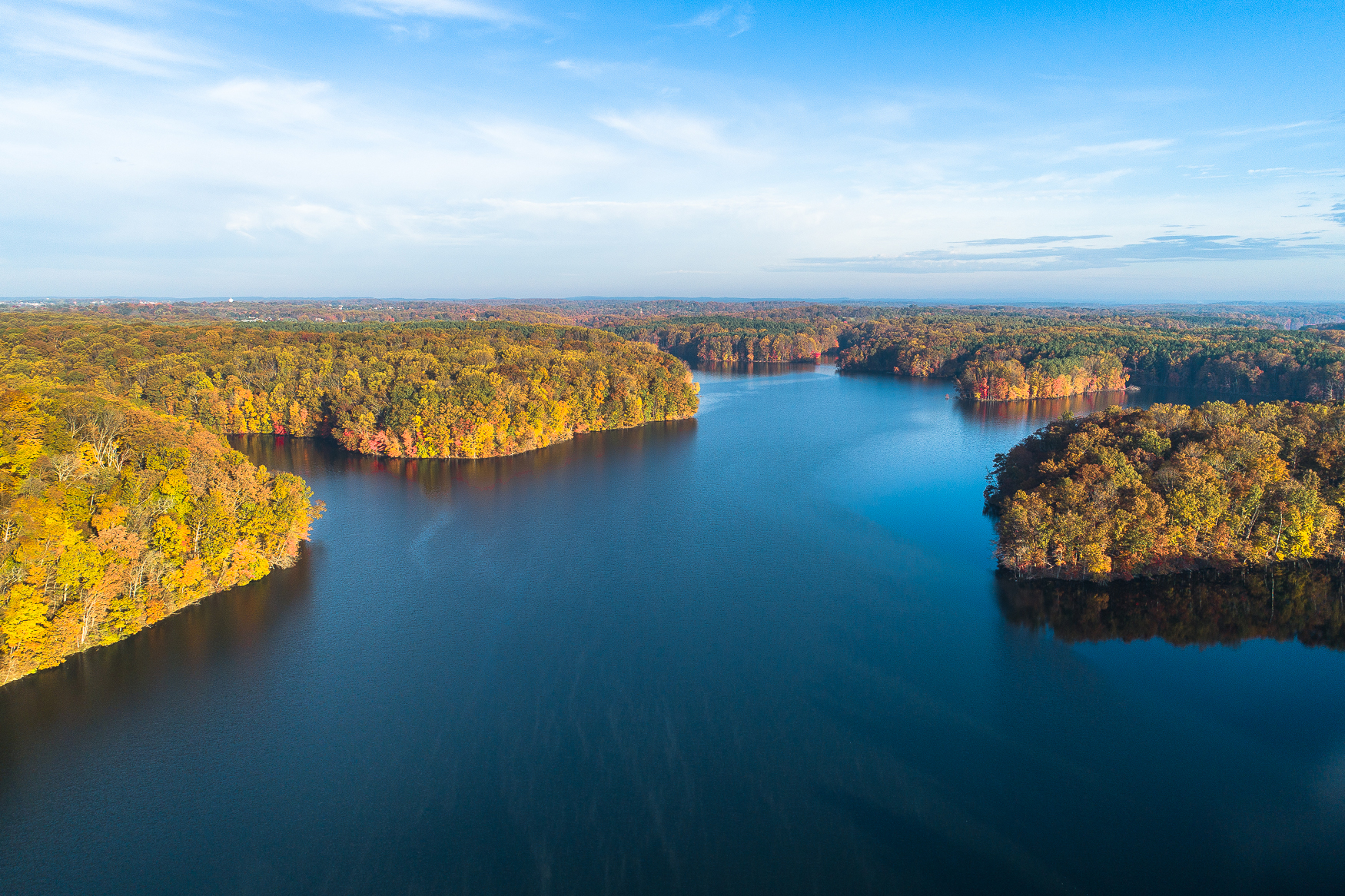
Liberty Reservoir

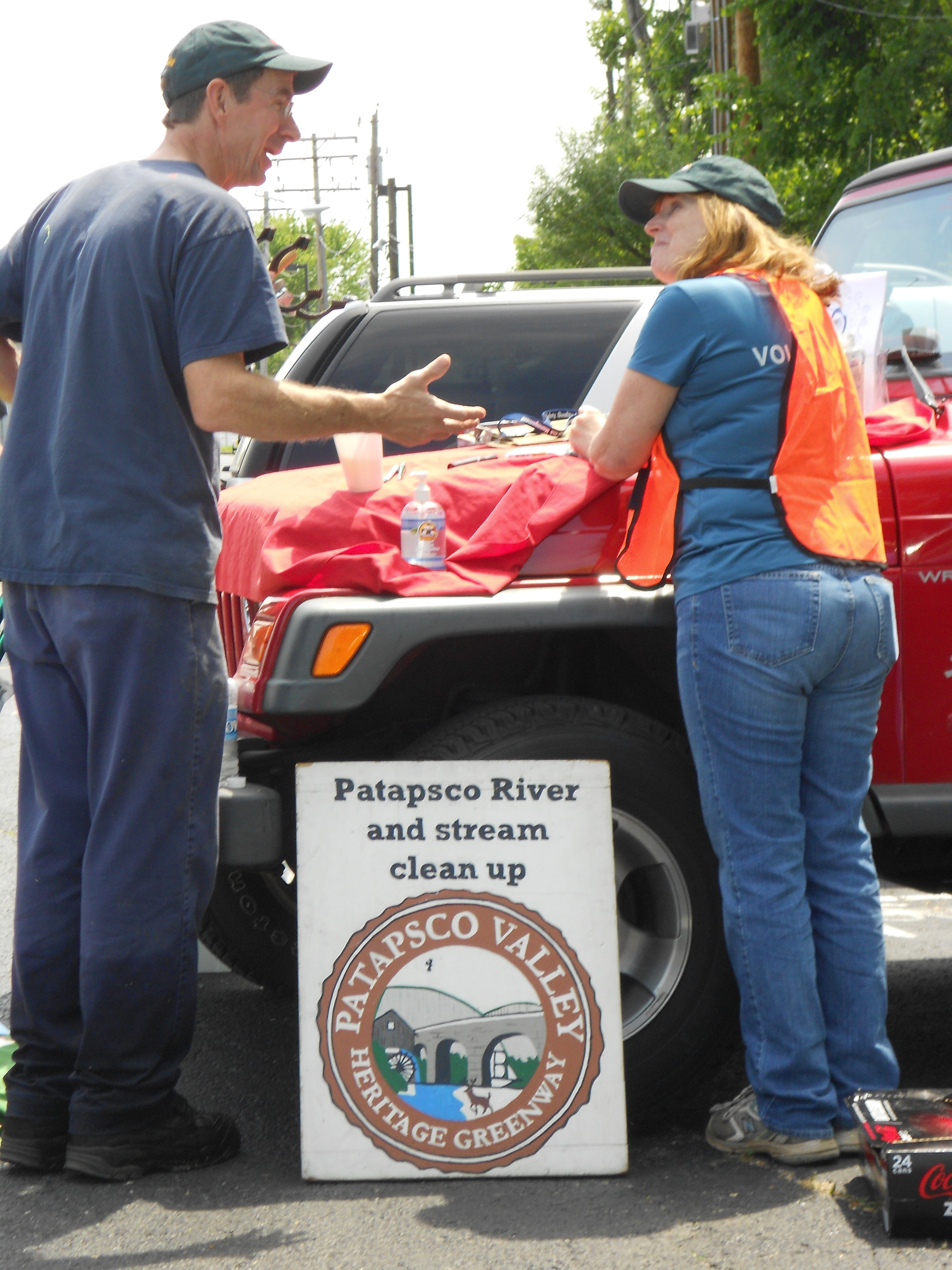
Volunteers at a community cleanup of Herbert Run, a tributary of the Patapsco River running through Arbutus, Maryland

The Patapsco River (/pəˈtæpˌskoʊ/ pə-TAP-skoh) mainstem is a 39-mile (63 km) river in central Maryland that flows into the Chesapeake Bay. The river's tidal portion forms the harbor for the city of Baltimore. With its South Branch, the Patapsco forms the northern border of Howard County, Maryland. The name "Patapsco" is derived from the Algonquian pota-psk-ut, which translates to "backwater" or "tide covered with froth".

== History ==
Captain John Smith was the first European to explore the river, noting it on his 1612 map as the Bolus River. The "Red river", named after the clay color, is considered the "old Bolus", as other branches were also labeled Bolus on maps.

The origin of the indigenous-derived modern name is unclear. The name first appears in land records from the 1650s, and is additionally labeled in a map of George Alsop created in 1660. Modern etymological research suggests that the name originates from Algonquian-speaking peoples as "pota-psk-ut", meaning "at the jutting ledge of rock" or "at the rocky point or corner." This was thus a reference to a location near the river, which settlers adapted for the river itself. This location is surmised to be the White Rocks, an outcropping of rocks opposite to where Rock Creek feeds into the Patapsco at Pasadena.

As the river was not navigable beyond Elkridge, it was not a significant path of commerce; in 1723, only one ship was listed as serving the northern branch, and four others operating around the mouth.

The first land record regarding Parr's Springs, the source of the South Branch, dates from 1744, when John Parr laid out a 200 acres (81 ha) tract he called Parr's Range. During the Civil War, Parr's Spring was a stop for the Army of the Potomac's Brig. Gen. David M. Gregg's cavalry, on 29 June 1863, while en route to Gettysburg, Pennsylvania. Parr's Spring was dug to form a 1.75 acres (7,100 m^{2}) pond in the 1950s, filled by seven spring heads that form the headwaters of the South Branch of the Patapsco River.

Beginning in the 1770s, the Patapsco River became the center of Maryland industrialization. Milling and manufacturing operations abounded along the river throughout the eighteenth and nineteenth centuries, generally powered by small dams. The Baltimore and Ohio Railroad's original main line was constructed in 1829 west along the Patapsco Valley; the nation's first railroad, the route remains, though much altered. Many railroad bridges were built in the valley, including the Thomas Viaduct, which is still in use, and the Patterson Viaduct, now in ruins. The 1907 hydropower Bloede's Dam powered flour mills.

An 1868 flood washed away 14 houses and killed 39 people around Ellicott City. A 1923 flood topped bridges. In 1952, an 8 ft (2.4 m) wall of water swept the shops of Ellicott City. A 1956 flood severely damaged the Bartigis Brothers plant. In 1972, rainfall from the remnants of Hurricane Agnes damaged Ellicott City and the Old Main Line. Two died in the July 2016 Maryland flood that ravaged Main Street in Ellicott City, followed two years later by a May 2018 Maryland flood that took the life of a rescuer.

The mouth of the Patapsco River forms Baltimore Harbor, the site of the Battle of Baltimore during the War of 1812. This is where Francis Scott Key, aboard the British HMS Tonnant, wrote "The Star-Spangled Banner", a poem later set to music as the national anthem of the United States. Today, a red, white, and blue buoy marks where the ship was anchored.

Bloede's Dam, a hydroelectric dam built in 1906, was on the Patapsco River within Patapsco Valley State Park, a nearly complete barrier to anadromous fish passage. Although a fish ladder was installed in 1992, it blocked five of six native fish species trying to run upstream to spawn. Efforts to remove Bloede's Dam began in the 1980s when nine drowning deaths occurred, and also to restore fish passage to a large portion of the Patapsco River watershed. Dam demolition began on 12 September 2018, opening the fishery and creating a rocky rapid for kayaking. Two dams upstream of Bloede's Dam, Simkins and Union, were removed in 2010. The removal of Bloede's Dam leaves Daniels Dam, 9 miles (14 km) upstream, as the last remaining dam along the mainstem Patapsco River.

In the early hours of 26 March 2024, the 1.6-mile-long (2.6 km) Francis Scott Key Bridge, which carried Interstate 695 over the Patapsco River, was struck by a container ship and partially collapsed into the river.

== Course ==
The 19.4-mile-long (31.2 km) South Branch rises at Parr's Spring, where Howard County, Carroll, Frederick, and Montgomery counties meet. The latter begins at elevation 780 feet (240 m) on Parr's Ridge, just south of Interstate 70 and east of Ridge Road (Highway 27), 2 miles (3 km) south of Mount Airy, Maryland. The South Branch Patapsco River traces the southern boundary of Carroll County and the northern boundary of Howard County.

The North Branch flows 20.9 miles (33.6 km) southward from its origins in Carroll County. Liberty Dam and its reservoir on the North Branch are major components of the Baltimore City water system.

The Patapsco River mainstem begins at the confluence of the North and South Branches, near Marriottsville, about 15 miles (24 km) west of downtown Baltimore. Through most of its length, the Patapsco is a minor river flowing mostly through a narrow valley. Patapsco Valley State Park extends along 32 miles (51 km) of the Patapsco and its branches, encompassing 14,000 acres (5,700 ha) in five areas. The river cuts a gorge 100 to 200 feet (35–70 m) deep within the park, with rocky cliffs and tributary waterfalls.

The last 10 miles (16 km), form a large tidal estuary inlet of the Chesapeake Bay. Two lobes of the harbor deviate from the "mainstem" harbor: the Middle Branch Patapsco River, into which the Gwynns Falls flows; and the Northwest Branch Patapsco River, into which the Jones Falls flows. The inner part of this estuary provides the harbor of Baltimore. Thoms Cove is further down the main harbor. The Patapsco estuary is south of the Back River and north of the Magothy River.

== Tributaries ==
The Patapsco has a watershed (including the water surface) of 950 square miles (2,460 km^{2}).

- Deep Run (Carroll County)
- Board Run (Baltimore County)
- Roaring Run (Carroll County)
- Liberty Reservoir (Carroll/Baltimore Counties)
- Piney Run (Carroll County)
- Keysers Run (Baltimore County)
- Beaver Run (Carroll County)
- Norris Run (Baltimore County)
- Timber Run (Baltimore County)
- Middle Run (Carroll County)
- Morgan Run (Carroll County)
- Locust Run (Baltimore County)
- Snowdens Run (Carroll County)
- Falls Run (Baltimore County)
- South Branch Patapsco River
- Davis Branch (Howard County)
- Brice Run (Baltimore County)
- Bens Run (Baltimore County)
- Cedar Branch (Baltimore County)
- Miller Run (Baltimore County)
- Sucker Branch (Howard County)
- Tiber River (Howard County)
- Cooper Branch (Baltimore County)
- Bonnie Branch (Howard County)
- Sawmill Branch (Baltimore County)
- Cascade Falls (Howard County)
- Soapstone Branch (Baltimore County)
- Rockburn Branch (Howard County)
- Deep Run (Howard/Anne Arundel County)
- Stony Run (Anne Arundel County)
- Herbert Run (Baltimore County)
- Holly Creek (Anne Arundel County)
- Middle Branch to Gwynns Falls (Baltimore City)
- Northwest Harbor to Jones Falls (Baltimore City)
- Colgate Creek (Baltimore City)
- Curtis Creek (Baltimore City)
- Bear Creek (Baltimore County)
- Cox Creek (Anne Arundel County)
- Stoney Creek (Anne Arundel County)
- Rock Creek (Anne Arundel County)
- Old Road Bay (Baltimore County)
- Bodkin Creek (Anne Arundel County)

== Ecology and conservation ==
The removal of Bloede's Dam in September 2018, opened up 65 miles (105 km) of the Patapsco River watershed, which will potentially restore spawning runs of at least six species of native anadromous fish: alewife (Alosa pseudoharengus), blueback herring (Alosa aestivalis), American shad (Alosa sapidissima), hickory shad (Alosa mediocris), striped bass (Morone saxatilis), sea lamprey (Petromyzon marinus), as only one species, sea lamprey, were found using the Bloede's Dam fish ladder in 2012. One catadromous species would likely also benefit, the American eel (Anguilla rostrata), a fish species that lives in freshwater and migrates to the ocean to breed. The Bloede's Dam removal project was led by American Rivers and the Maryland Department of Natural Resources.

Now that Bloede's Dam has been removed, removal of Daniels Dam upstream on the mainstem Patapsco River would open to anadromous fishes the remaining 6.5 miles (10.5 km) of Patapsco River mainstem, the entire 19.4 miles (31.2 km) length of the South Branch Patapsco River, 3.5 miles (5.6 km) of the North Branch Patapsco River up to the Liberty Dam, and many of these rivers' tributaries.

== Water quality ==
The eastern portion of the Patapsco River is in a highly urbanized area and is subject to extensive stormwater runoff and other forms of water pollution. The Maryland Department of the Environment has identified the Lower North Branch as containing high levels of heavy metals (chromium, arsenic, cadmium, copper, mercury, nickel, lead, selenium, and zinc), as well as phosphorus, fecal coliform bacteria, and PCBs. The Piney Run Reservoir on the South Branch of the Patapsco is polluted by excess levels of phosphorus and sediment.

Environmental nonprofit organizations, such as The Friends of Patapsco Valley & Heritage Greenway, Inc. (PHG), lead clean-up efforts by the residents of surrounding communities. From 2006 to 2012, PHG volunteers participated in 183 stream clean-ups, removing 264 tons of trash from the streams of the Patapsco Valley watershed.

== Recreation ==
Recreational swimming is possible in areas of the Patapsco River, sometimes involving rope swings, inner tubing, and wading. The river also serves as a venue for rafting. The Patapsco is also popular for fishing. The MD DNR stocks parts of Patapsco State Park in the early spring and offers opportunities for trout fishing. The Northern Snakehead has also made the Patapsco their home. They can be found from historic Ellicott City to the harbor.

== Crossings ==
This is a list of all crossings of the main stem of the Patapsco River, as well as its two downstream short branches, the Middle Branch and Northwest Branch. Listings start downstream and continue upstream to the sources of the rivers.

Image	Crossing	Carries	Location	Opened	Notes
Anne Arundel County – Baltimore County
	Francis Scott Key Bridge	I-695	Baltimore	1977–2024	Collapsed after being struck by a container ship on 26 March 2024
	Baltimore Harbor Tunnel	I-895	Baltimore	1957	$4.00 toll
	Fort McHenry Tunnel	I-95	Baltimore	1985	Crosses Northwest Branch only; $4.00 toll
	Hanover Bridge	MD 2	Baltimore		Crosses Middle Branch only
	Spring Garden Swing Bridge	Western Maryland Railway	Baltimore	1904	Crosses Middle Branch only
	Ridgleys Cove interchange	I-95 I-395	Baltimore		Crosses Middle Branch only
	Light rail bridge	Baltimore Light RailLink	Baltimore		Crosses Middle Branch only
	Hanover and Potee Street Bridges	MD 2	Baltimore	1973	Hanover Street Bridge reconstructed in 2005
	Curtis Bay Branch Railroad bridge	B&O Curtis Bay Branch	Baltimore		
	Patapsco Avenue bridge	Patapsco Avenue	Brooklyn, Baltimore	1961	
	I-895 bridge near South West Area Park	I-895	Baltimore Highlands	1958	Refurbished in 2019
	Central Light Rail bridge	Baltimore Light Rail	Baltimore Highlands	1908	Previously used for the Baltimore and Annapolis Railroad
	Old Annapolis Road bridge	MD 648	Baltimore Highlands		
	BW Parkway bridge	MD 295	Baltimore Highlands	1948	Refurbished in 1985
	Hammonds Ferry Road bridge	Hammonds Ferry Road	Linthicum; Lansdowne	1961	
	Baltimore Beltway bridge	I-695	Linthicum; Lansdowne	1958	Refurbished in 1982
	Northeast Corridor bridge	Amtrak Northeast Corridor	Linthicum; Halethorpe		
	I-195 bridge	I-195	Elkridge; Halethorpe	1988	
Howard County – Baltimore County
	I-895 bridge	I-895	Elkridge; Relay	1973	On/off ramp bridges flank US 1 bridge to north and south
	Patapsco River Bridge	US 1	Elkridge; Relay	1915	Concrete arch bridge refurbished in 1952
	Thomas Viaduct	B&O Capital Subdivision	Elkridge; Relay	1835	World's largest multiple arched bridge. Named after Philip E. Thomas.
	I-95 bridge	I-95	Elkridge; Relay	1968	
	Gun Road bridge	Gun Road	Relay		Patapsco Valley State Park access only
	Patapsco Swinging Bridge	Swinging Bridge Trail	Ilchester	2006	Pedestrian bridge connecting River Road to Grist Mill Trail
	Patterson Viaduct	Grist Mill Trail	Ilchester	2006	Former rail bridge opened 1829, destroyed 1868, and rebuilt 1869; new footbridge built on abutments of prior rail bridge
	Ilchester Bridge	Old Main Line Subdivision	Ilchester	1903	
	Ilchester Road bridge	Ilchester Road	Ilchester		Known as Heartbeat Bridge in local folklore.
	Main Street Bridge	MD 144	Ellicott City; Oella	1914	
	Baltimore National Pike Bridge	US 40	Ellicott City; Catonsville	1936	Reconstructed using original arches in 2014
	I-70 bridge	I-70	Ellicott City; Catonsville	1966	
	Hollifield Bridge	Old Frederick Road	Daniels	1934	
	Daniels bridge	Old Main Line Subdivision	Daniels		
	Eureka bridge	Old Main Line Subdivision	Mt. Airy		
	MD 125 bridge	MD 125	Woodstock	1981	
Patapsco River North Branch-South Branch confluence

== See also ==
- Patapsco Vallis, a valley on Mars named after the river in Maryland
- Bloede's Dam
- List of Maryland rivers
- List of parks in the Baltimore–Washington metropolitan area
- Liberty Reservoir
