= Patapsco Camp, Civilian Public Service =

American Civilian Public Service

The Patapsco Camp or the CPS Camp No. 3 was a Civilian Public Service camp established during World War II for conscientious objectors. Located at the Patapsco Valley State Park near Baltimore, the site was the first Civilian Public Service camp for conscientious objectors in the United States.

== History ==
The camp was opened on May 15, 1941, and closed in September 1942. The camp was a National Park Service base camp located on a former Civilian Conservation Corps (CCC) camp near Elkridge, Maryland, in the Patapsco Valley State Park, then known as the Patapsco State Forest. The CCC camp was known as Camp Tydings, as New Deal project operating between 1933 and 1942. The camp allowed drafted conscientious objectors, predominantly Christian pacifists, to serve the country without fighting in the war. The men serving in the camp faced public hostility. One conscientious objector received a letter calling conscientious objectors "Hitler's little helpers".

The camp was 2 to 3 acres in size and included eight buildings, including barracks. The only remaining structure in the Patapsco State Park is a fireplace located underneath a picnic shelter. Some paths from the camp remain, but lead to nowhere. The remains can be found at Shelter #1, located at the Avalon area of the Patapsco Valley State Park.

The first twenty-six conscientious objectors at the camp arrived alongside fifty-four reporters and photographers. Referred to as "the gold fish bowl", the press focused on the "peculiarity" of conscientious objectors' beliefs.

Operated by the American Friends Service Committee, about one-third of conscientious objectors were Quakers. One-third were Mainline Protestants. The remaining third mostly belonged to other Protestant denominations such as Christadelphians, Jehovah's Witnesses, Brethren, Mennonites, or were religiously non-affiliated. The population of objectors were relatively educated, with over half being college educated and many were professionals. Only twenty-five percent were working class, having technical, skilled, or non-skilled jobs.

A 70th anniversary celebration of the camp was held on May 15, 2011. The event was attended by members of the historic peace churches, staff from the Center on Conscience & War and the Mennonite Central Committee, Civilian Public Service alumni and their family members, and historians.

== See also ==
- Anti-war movement
- Civilian Public Service
- Conscientious objector
- Conscription in the United States
- Pacifism in the United States
- Patapsco Valley State Park
