= Patapsco Swinging Bridge =

Pedestrian suspension bridge in Maryland

Coordinates: 39.241159°N 76.74968°W

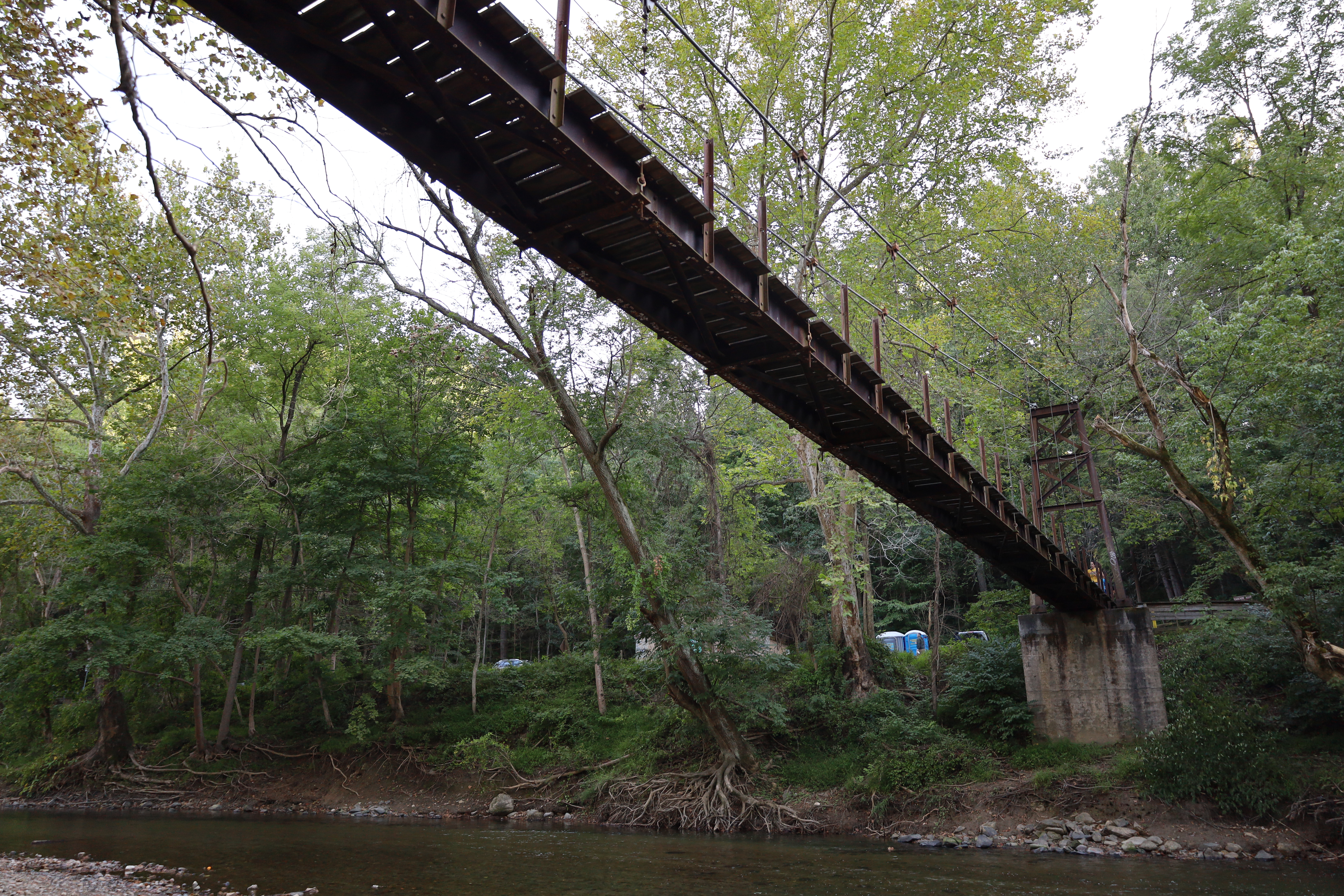
The bridge from below

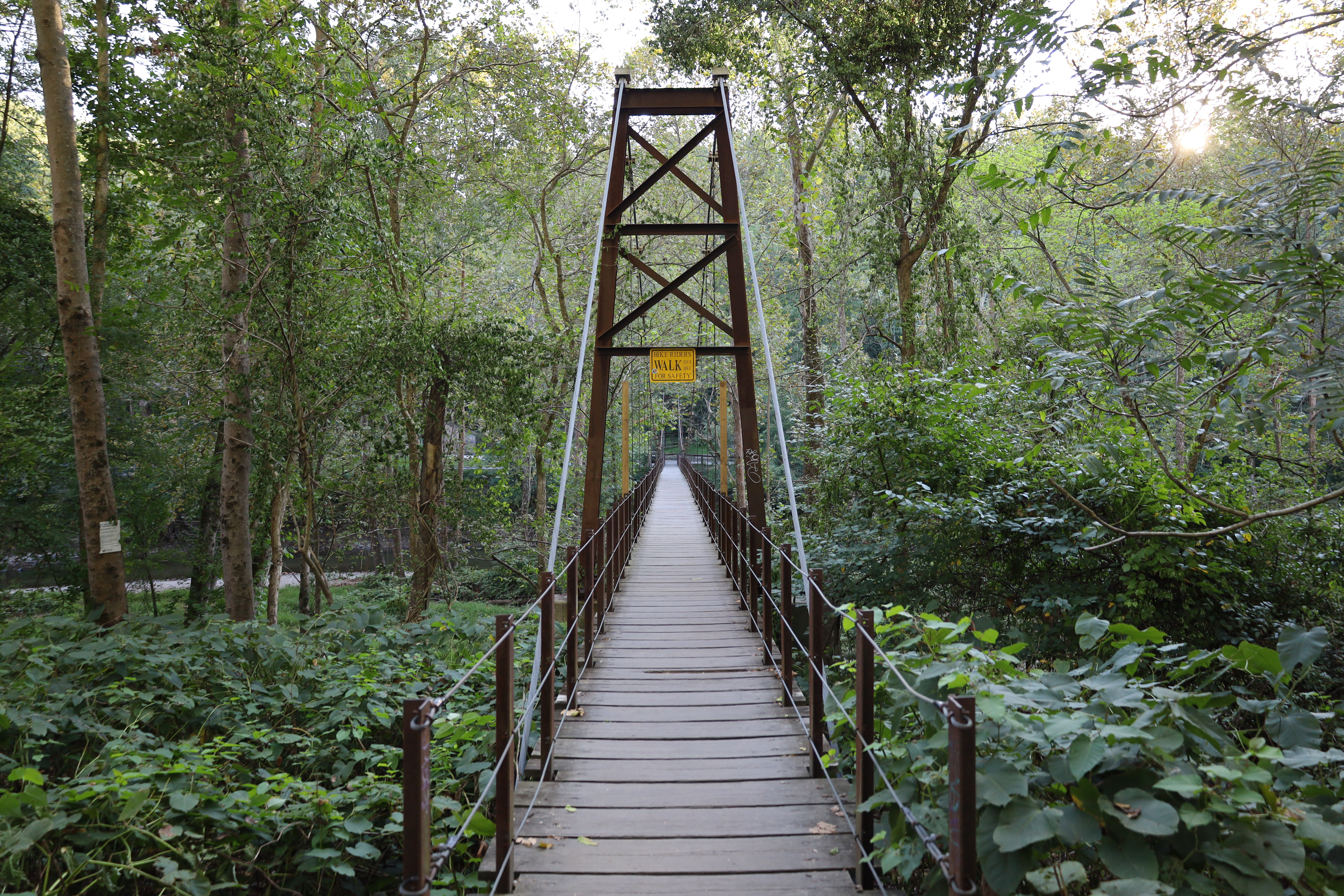
Deck of the bridge

The Patapsco Swinging Bridge is a pedestrian suspension bridge located in the Avalon/Orange Grove area of Patapsco Valley State Park in central Maryland, United States, just outside of Baltimore. It consists of a wooden deck supported by large cables. The Patapsco Valley has a history of "swinging" bridges built for pedestrian travel from one side of the river to the other. The Orange Grove Flour Mill was one such popular crossing and is where the current bridge now stands. The first bridge was built by the Orange Grove Flour Mill for employees to cross the river. The new swinging bridge, built by the Maryland Department of Natural Resources, is one of the most well known and most popular attractions at the Patapsco Valley State Park.

== Grist Mill Trail Bridge ==
The new swinging bridge was constructed October 6, 2006. It is located at the end of the new Grist Mill Trail in the Avalon area, crossing the Patapsco River and joining with Ilchester Road. This new pedestrian bridge completes the 1.25-mile (2.01 km) Grist Mill Trail extension, a trail that provides access into Patapsco Valley State Park from Ellicott City, Catonsville and other upstream communities for the first time since Hurricane Agnes struck in June 1972. The grand opening for the bridge was November 4, 2006.

== See also ==
- Patapsco Valley State Park
- Bloede Dam
- Thomas Viaduct
