= Patapsco Valley State Park =

State park in Maryland, United States

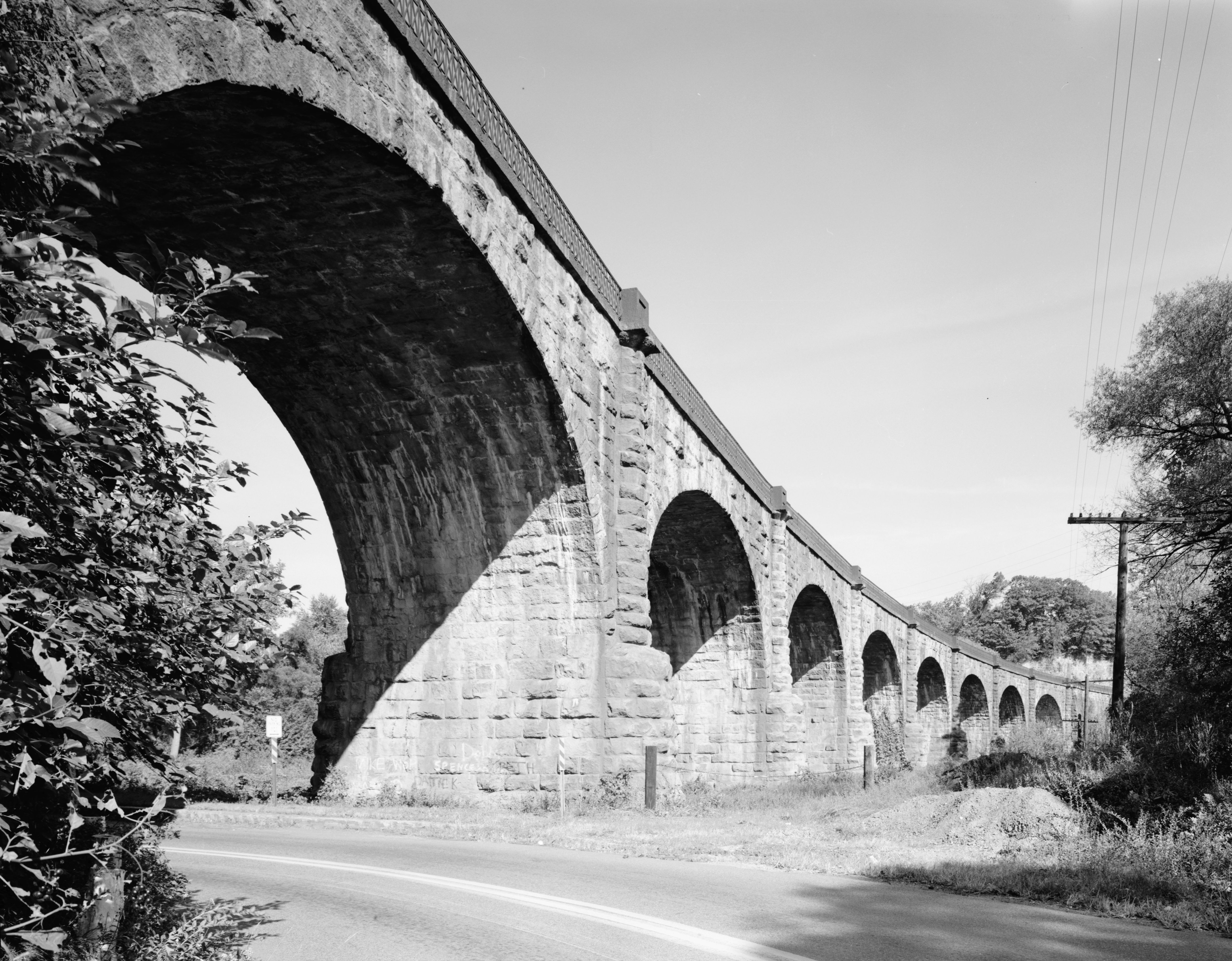
- The Thomas Viaduct, a signature monument of Patapsco Valley State Park

- Location within Maryland
- Location: Anne Arundel, Baltimore, Carroll and Howard counties, Maryland, United States
- Nearest city: Baltimore, Maryland
- Coordinates: 39°17′35″N 76°47′12″W
- Area: 14,296 acres (5,785 ha)
- Elevation: 374 ft (114 m)
- Established: 1907
- Administrator: Maryland Department of Natural Resources
- Designation: Maryland state park
- Website: Official website

Patapsco Valley State Park /pəˈtæpˌskoʊ/ is a Maryland state park extending along 32 miles (51 km) of the Patapsco River south and west of the city of Baltimore, Maryland. The park encompasses multiple developed areas on over 14,000 acres (5,700 ha) of land, making it Maryland's largest state park. In 2006, it was officially celebrated as Maryland's first state park, its first formation being in 1906. Patapsco Valley State Park is managed by the Maryland Department of Natural Resources.

== History ==
20th century

Formation of the park started with provisions in the Forestry Act of 1906. The completion of Bloede Dam in 1906 required the implementation of protections to prevent silting from nearby farm erosion. Patapsco Valley State Park was established as Patapsco State Forest Reserve in 1907 to protect the valley's forest and water resources. The first 43 acres were donated by Russell Sage Foundation director John Mark Glenn (1858–1950) from his Hilton estate. Glenn's Hilton became the namesake for the park's Hilton Area. In 1912, Maryland delegate Carville Benson promoted expanding the Patapsco Forest Reserve as a park to support his suburban development initiatives. As other sections along the river were added, Patapsco Valley State Park eventually became the largest park in Maryland.

In 1933, the Civilian Conservation Corps opened State Park Project 2 work camps 336 and 356 at the park. CCC workers created recreational facilities and performed tree plantings for erosion control and silt management around the dam from adjacent overworked farms. Keeping the shores and hillsides vegetated minimized erosion, thus minimizing the amount of silt that could clog the turbines of Bloede's Dam which generated electricity for surrounding communities.

On May 15, 1941, the camp was converted to the nation's first Civilian Public Service conscientious objector camp, CPS Camp #3, with 26 men and three women required to serve for one year, a term that was extended as the United States entered World War II.

21st century

In 2014, Howard County and Baltimore County approved the Patapsco Heritage Greenway, Inc. management plan for the Patapsco Heritage Area with includes a portion of the Patapsco Valley State Park.

In 2015, 24.6 square miles which includes a portion of the Patapsco Valley State Park, was certified as the Maryland's 13th Heritage Area by the Maryland Heritage Areas Authority. The Maryland Chapter of the Sierra Club opposed the project out of concern of additional development on the valuable land, of which the Maryland Department of Natural Resources would be the approving authority.

== Activities and amenities ==
The park's recreational opportunities include hiking, fishing, camping, canoeing, horseback riding, mountain biking, and picnicking. The Baltimore City Paper named the park as its "Best Place to Hike" in 2007.

Park areas

- McKeldin Area: The park's most western section features multi-use trails for horseback riding, mountain biking and hiking, a disc golf course, fishing at the confluence of the North and South branches of the Patapsco River, and the Rapids area on the South Branch.
- Daniels Area: Once the site of a milltown called Daniels, the Daniels Dam here backs up the Patapsco River providing smooth water for canoeing and kayaking, fishing, and swimming.

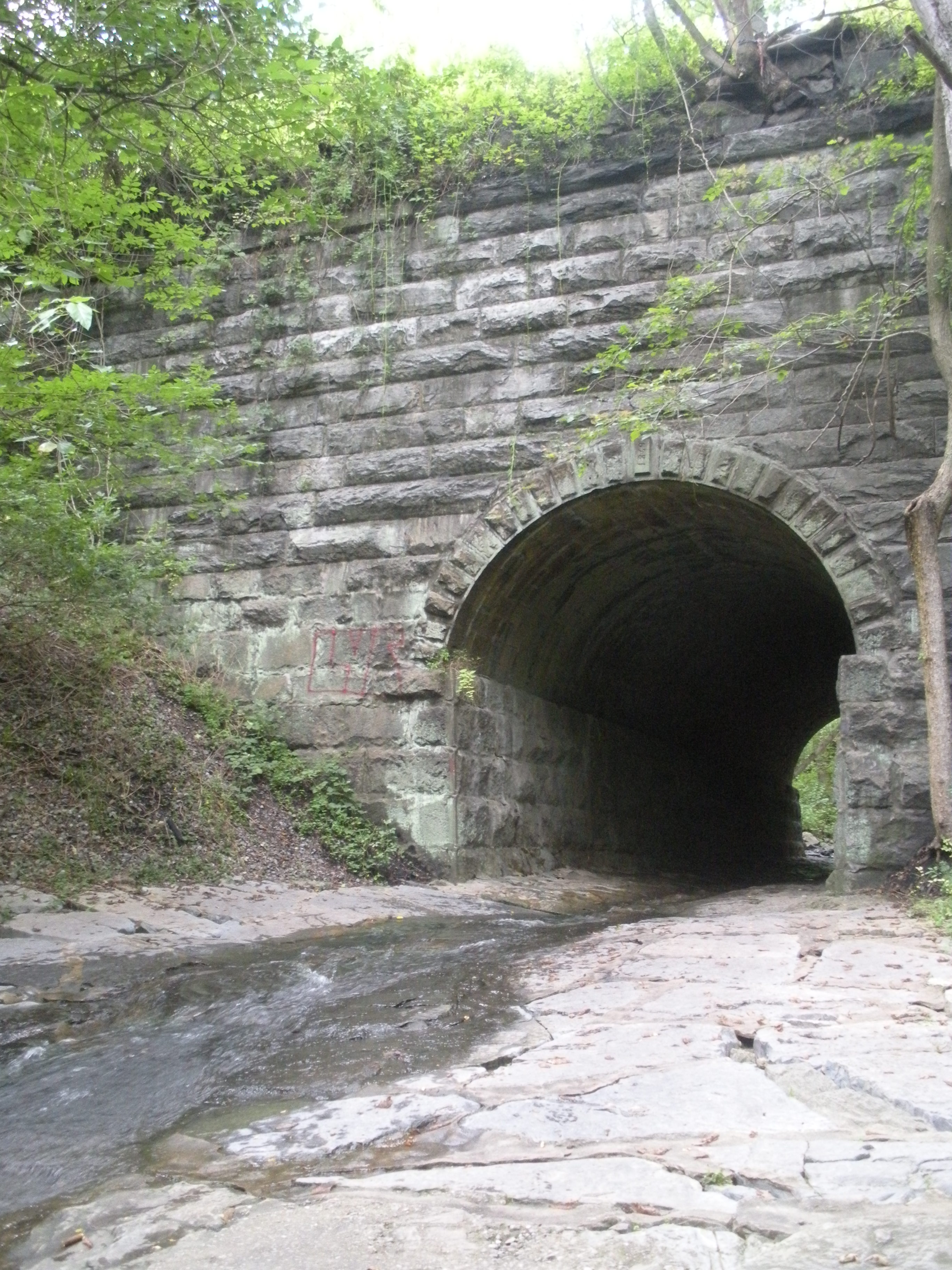
Tunnel along Grist Mill Trail, Avalon Area. CSX Railroad runs above tunnel.

- Hollofield Area: The park's center section features a 73-site campground, hiking trails, and shelters built by the CCC in the 1930s, plus a scenic overlook of the entire river valley.
- Pickall Area: Picnic shelters and playgrounds.
- Hilton Area: Located near Catonsville, the area has a small campground with mini-cabins, a nature center for children, tire playground, and access to the Saw Mill Branch Trail and other trails. This is the oldest area of the park, in use since 1906.
- Avalon/Glen Artney/Orange Grove Flour Mill Area: The area features many historic sites including the Thomas Viaduct, the dismantled Bloede Dam, the Old Gun Road Stone Arch Bridge, Orange Grove Flour Mill, and the Swinging Bridge. The Avalon Visitor Center (reopened April 2022) is housed in a remnant of the milltown of the same name that once served the Avalon Nail and Iron Works.

Swinging bridges

There are two swinging bridges that cross the Patapsco River. The first spans the Patapsco at Orange Grove, 1.6 miles (2.6 km) northwest of Avalon following the Park Road in Howard County beyond shelters 104 and 105. Prior suspension foot bridges at this location enabled residents of the Orange Grove mill community to cross the river to Baltimore County to work in the five-storey-high Orange Grove Flour Mill of the C.A. Gambrill Manufacturing Company that burned to the ground in 1905. Visitors can cross the bridge to discover the ruins of the mill site that extended from the railroad tracks to the Swinging Bridge abutment.

A second swinging bridge opened November 4, 2006. It is located at the end of the Grist Mill Trail and crosses the Patapsco River to connect with Ilchester Road. This new bridge allows easy entry for residents living in Ellicott City and Catonsville for the first time since Hurricane Agnes struck in 1972.

Cascade Falls

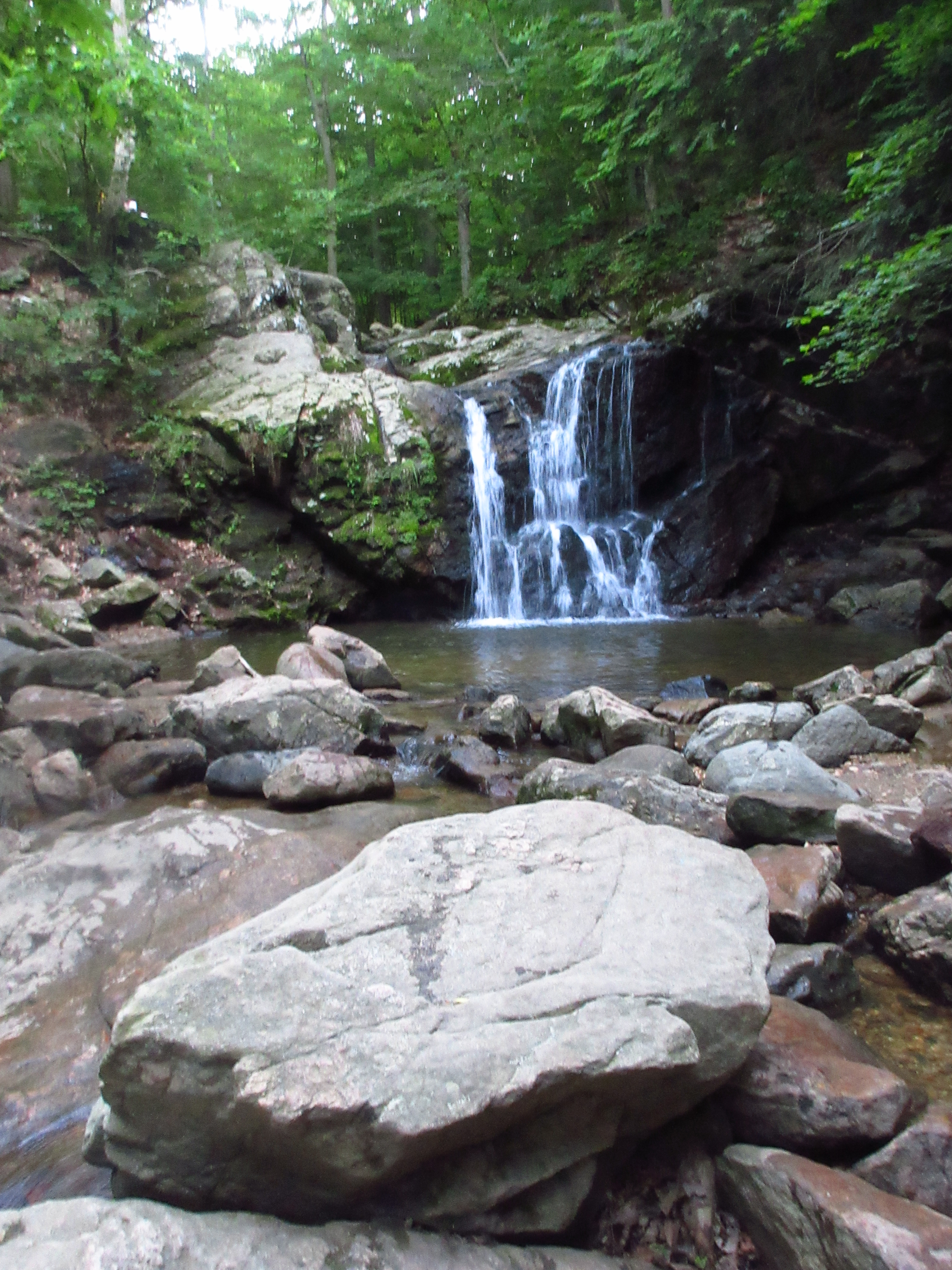
View of the Cascade Falls waterfall, Orange Grove Area.

Cascade Falls is located in the Orange Grove area of the park. It gently descends a 10–15-foot (3.0–4.6 m) face and can be reached by way of a marked trail at the last parking lot in the Orange Grove area.

== Volunteerism ==
Patapsco Valley State Park is supported by a number of volunteer groups and efforts, most notably:

- Friends of Patapsco Valley State Park: Non-profit group independent of the park and Maryland Department of Natural Resources, the Friends organize volunteer work days and target specific projects like surveying and constructing new trails within the park.
- Patapsco Heritage Greenway: Non-profit group independent of the park and Maryland DNR, PHG specializes in environmental volunteerism and education efforts as the caretaker organization for the Patapsco Valley Heritage Area.
- Volunteer Ranger program: State-wide program devised by the Maryland Park Service; Patapsco is one of a number of parks utilizing the program. Volunteer Rangers are a unique type of volunteer, receiving training and uniforms (with added volunteer insignia) from the state, and working more closely with park staff to support operations and complete various projects.

== In popular culture ==
In 1999, final scenes of The Blair Witch Project were filmed in the Griggs House, a 200-year-old building located in the park near Granite, Maryland, that was subsequently demolished by the state despite film buffs' efforts to save it.

== See also ==
- Henryton State Hospital
- Liberty Reservoir
- Morgan Run Natural Environment Area
