= Thomas Viaduct =

Historic basket handle masonry arch railroad bridge in Maryland, US

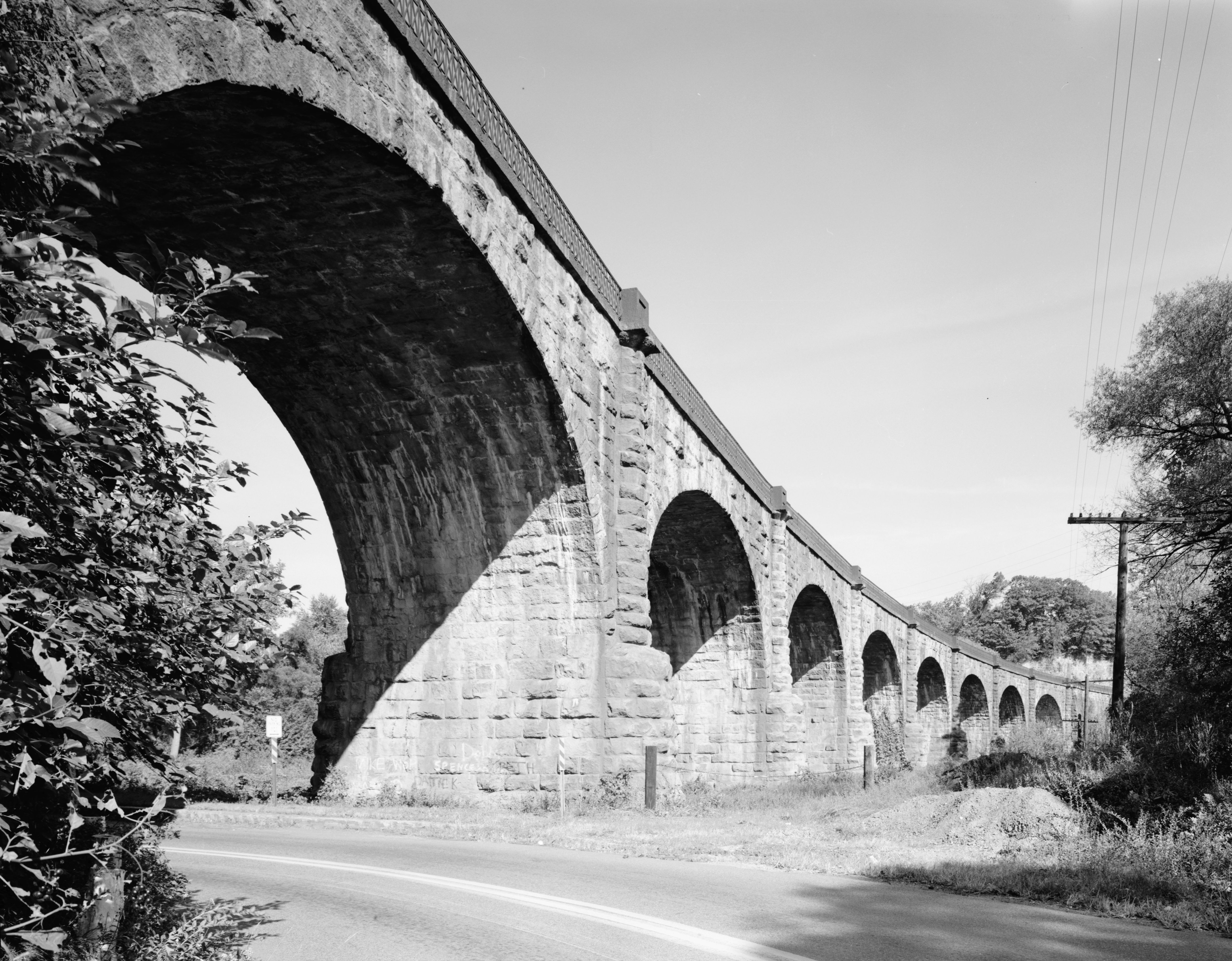
- Coordinates: 39°13′18″N 76°42′48″W
- Carries: Railroad
- Crosses: Patapsco River
- Locale: Elkridge, Maryland
- Owner: CSX Transportation
- Heritage status: NRHP 66000388

Characteristics
- Design: Basket-handle arch bridge
- Material: Patapsco granite
- Total length: 612 feet (187 m)
- Width: 26 feet 4 inches (8 m)
- Height: 59 feet (18 m)
- Longest span: 58 feet (18 m)
- No. of spans: 8

History
- Designer: Benjamin Henry Latrobe, II
- Constructed by: John McCartney
- Construction start: 1833
- Opened: July 4, 1835
- Thomas Viaduct, Baltimore & Ohio Railroad
- U.S. National Register of Historic Places
- U.S. National Historic Landmark
- Location within Maryland
- Area: 0.5 acres (0.20 ha)
- NRHP reference No.: 66000388
- Added to NRHP: October 15, 1966

Location
- Interactive map of Thomas Viaduct

The Thomas Viaduct is a viaduct that spans the Patapsco River and Patapsco Valley between Relay, Maryland and Elkridge, Maryland, USA. It was commissioned by the Baltimore and Ohio Railroad (B&O); built between July 4, 1833, and July 4, 1835; and named for Philip E. Thomas, the company's first president. Some claim it to be the world's oldest multiple arched stone railroad bridge. However, the Sankey Viaduct on the Liverpool and Manchester Railway was opened in 1830 and finally completed in 1833.

At its completion, the Thomas Viaduct was the largest railroad bridge in the United States and the country's first multi-span masonry railroad bridge to be built on a curve. In 1964, it was designated as a National Historic Landmark. In 2010, the bridge was designated as a National Historic Civil Engineering Landmark by the American Society of Civil Engineers.

The viaduct is now owned and operated by CSX Transportation and is still in use today, making it one of the oldest railroad bridges still in service.

== Design ==
Thomas Viaduct of the Baltimore and Ohio railroad as an example of a basket handle arch.

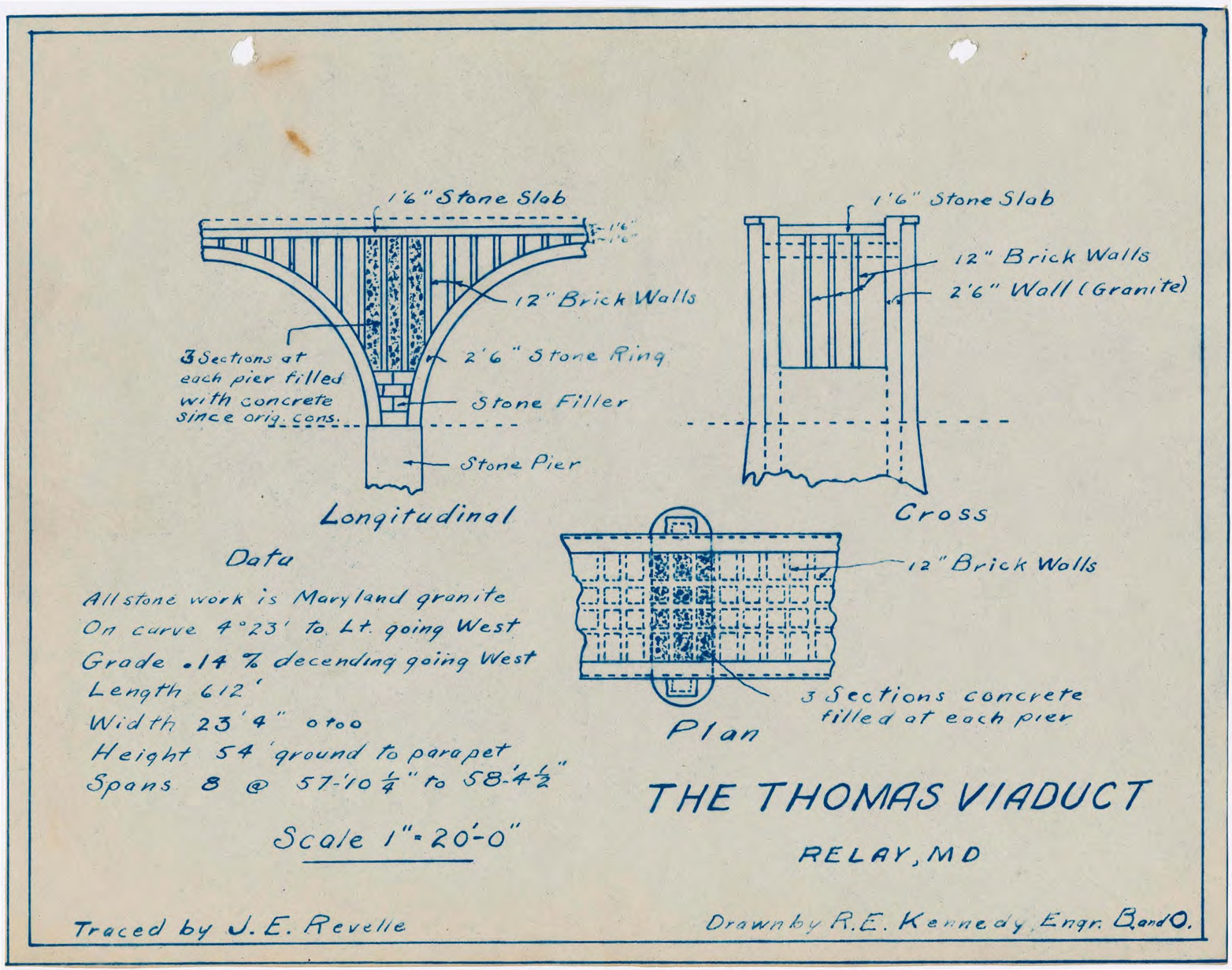
Engineering drawing of the Arches at Thomas Viaduct in Relay, Maryland

This basket-handle arch stone bridge with three centers is divided into eight spans. The bridge deck is 26' wide, broad enough to hold a double track. It was designed by Benjamin Henry Latrobe, II, then B&O's assistant engineer and later its chief engineer. The main design problem to overcome was that of constructing such a large bridge on a curve. The design called for several variations in span and pier widths between the opposite sides of the structure. This problem was solved by laying the lateral pier faces on radial lines, making the piers essentially wedge-shaped and fitted to the 4-degree curve.

The viaduct was built by John McCartney of Ohio, who received the contract after completing the Patterson Viaduct. Caspar Wever, the railroad's chief of construction, supervised the work.

The span of the viaduct is 612 feet (187 m) long; the individual arches are roughly 58 feet (18 m) in span, with a height of 59 feet (18 m) from the water level to the base of the rail. The width at the top of the spandrel wall copings is 26 feet 4 inches (8 m). The bridge is constructed using a rough-dressed Maryland granite ashlar from Patapsco River quarries, known as Woodstock granite. A wooden-floored walkway built for pedestrian and railway employee use is 4 feet (1 m) wide and supported by cast iron brackets and edged with ornamental cast iron railings. The viaduct contains 24,476 cubic yards (18,713 m^{3}) of masonry and cost $142,236.51, equal to $4,439,156 today.

== History ==
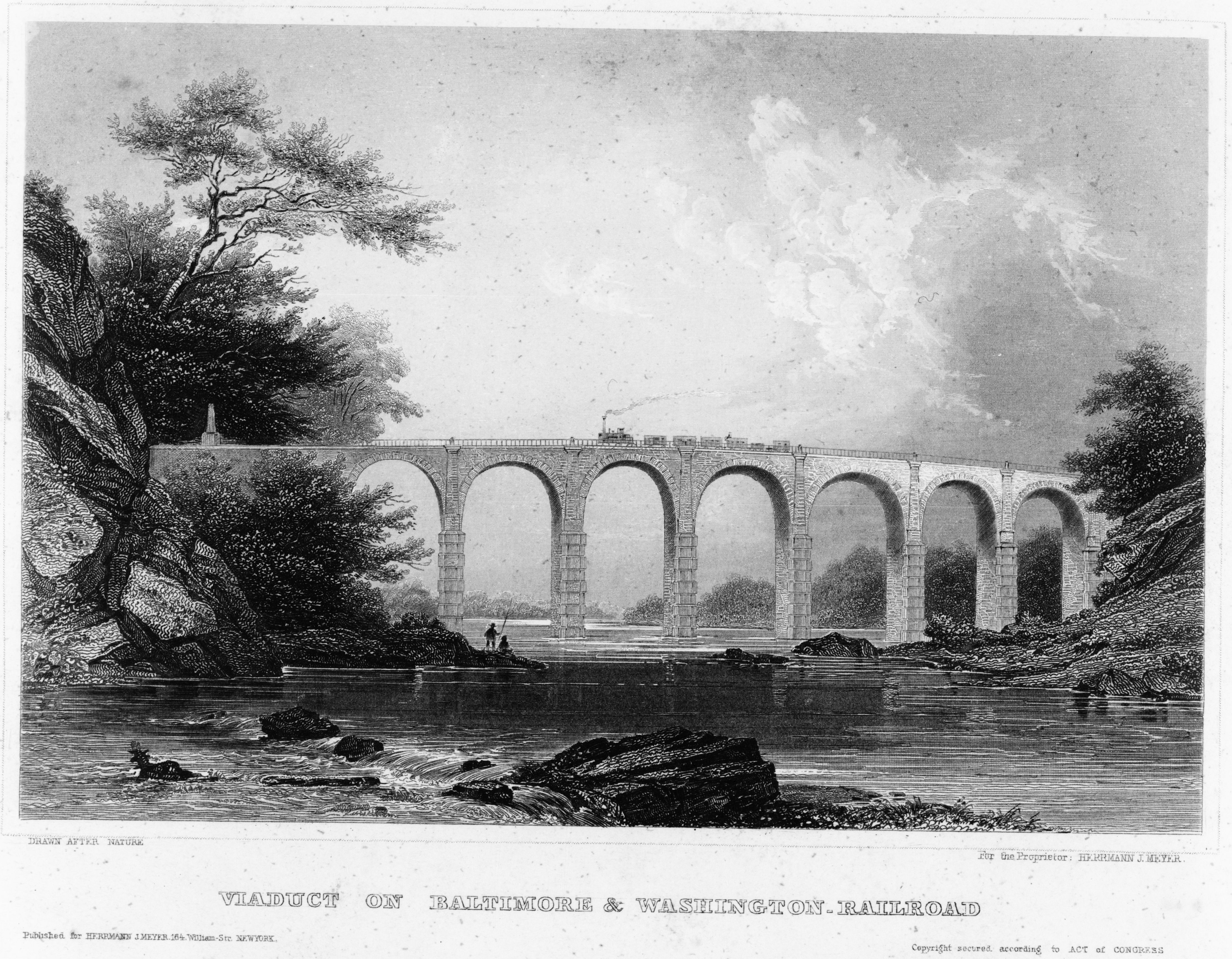
Thomas Viaduct, c. 1858

The Baltimore and Ohio Railroad was one of the oldest railroads in the United States. Construction began on July 4, 1828, with the original route following the upper branch of the Patapsco River which led west to Ellicott's Mills (later renamed Ellicott City) from the lower Patapsco which is the "Basin" (now Inner Harbor) at downtown Baltimore and the Baltimore Harbor and Port of the lower river estuary leading southeast 15 miles to flow into the Chesapeake Bay. (See Baltimore Terminal Subdivision and Old Main Line Subdivision.) In 1835, the Washington Branch was constructed, including the Thomas Viaduct. This new line branched at Relay, the site of a former post road hotel and changing point for stage horses. The 1830s Relay House served as a hotel until it was replaced by the $50,078.41 (equal to $1,345,857 today) Viaduct Hotel in 1872. The Gothic combination railroad station and hotel operated until 1938 and was torn down in 1950.

When the Thomas Viaduct was completed, a 15-foot (5 m) obelisk with the names of the builder, directors of the railroad, the architect (engineer) and others associated with the viaduct was erected at the east end in Relay, by builder John McCartney. On one side the monument reads: The Thomas Viaduct, Commenced July 4, 1833 Finished, July 4, 1835. He also celebrated the completed work by having his men kneel on the deck of the viaduct while mock "baptizing" them with a pint of whiskey.

Soon after its completion, two European engineers visited the Viaduct and reported on it. During the period of 1834-1835, Michel Chevalier was commissioned by the French government to study the North American canal and railroad networks. Chevalier produced a two-volume report, "Histoire et description des voies de communication aux etats-Unis (1840–1841). By 1838, Franz Anton von Gerstner was the "... leading engineer and scholar of the emerging railroad industry on the continent of Europe." Because of railroad growth in the United States, von Gerstner felt the need to study American railroads, including the Baltimore and Ohio Railroad and the Thomas Viaduct.

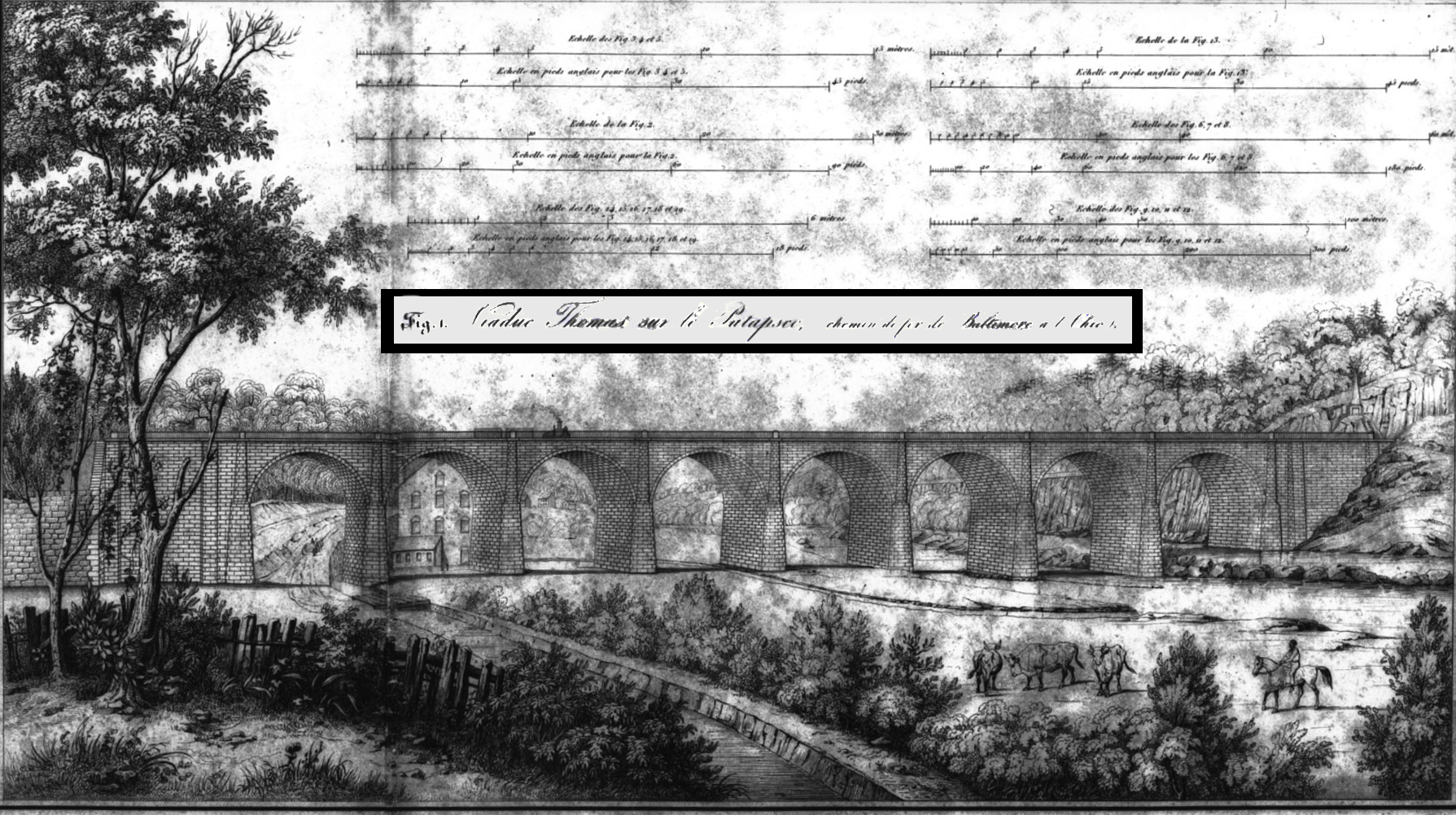
1835 Chevalier drawing of the newly constructed Thomas Viaduct, looking west

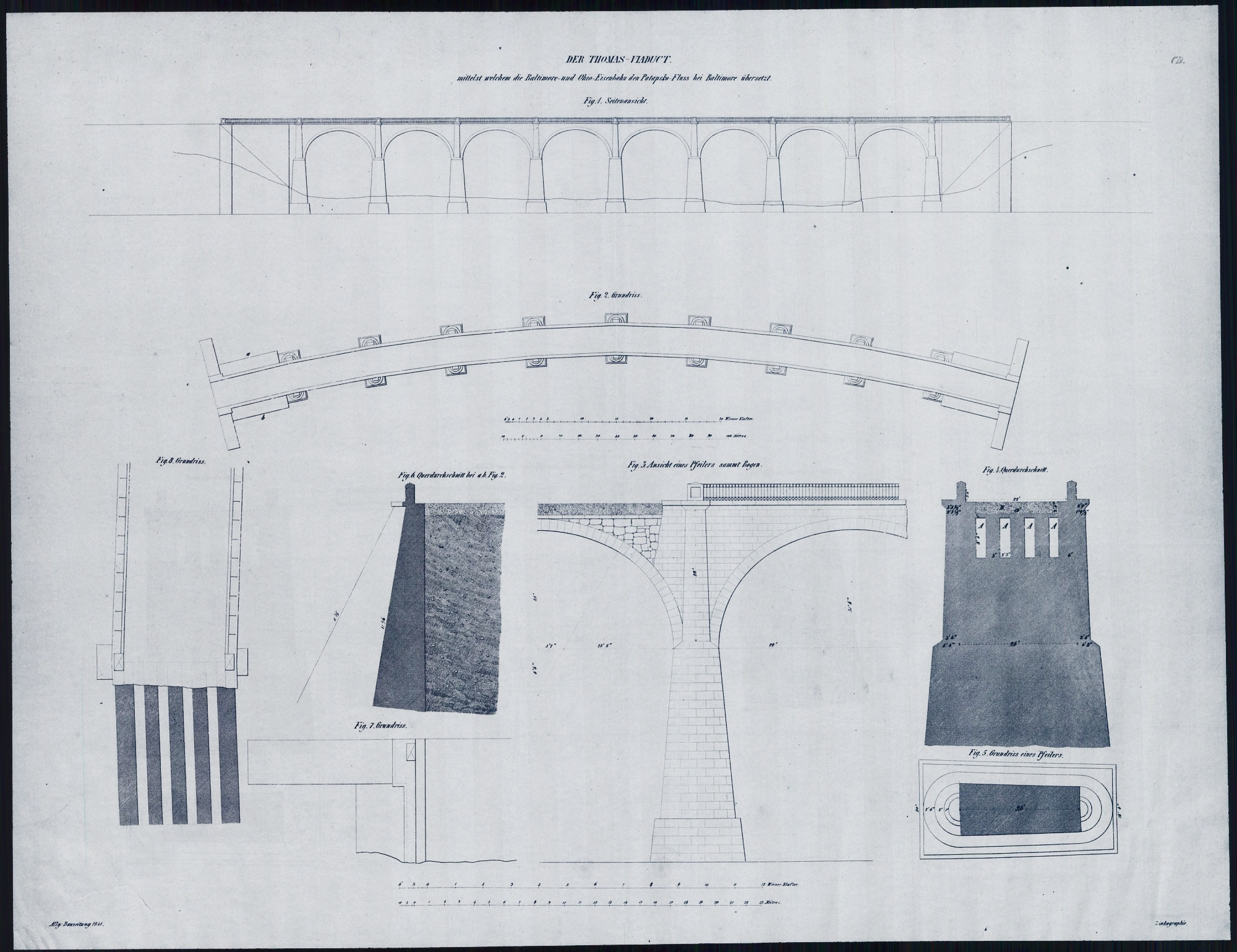
1843 Gerstner drawing of Thomas Viaduct

Until after the American Civil War, the B&O was the only railroad into Washington, D.C.; thus, the Thomas Viaduct was essential for supply trains to reach the capital of the Union during that conflict. Union troops stationed along its length heavily guarded the bridge to prevent sabotage.

In 1929, extensive mortar work on the masonry was carried out, and again in 1937. To counteract the deterioration of the masonry, the Thomas Viaduct underwent more cosmetic upgrades in 1938 performed by the B&O Maintenance of Way Department. The work consisted primarily of improving facilities for drainage, relocation of loose arch ring stones, and the application of a grout mixture to the stone spandrels filling. Nevertheless, the bridge is still indicative of the way in which the B&O track and major structures were put down in the most permanent manner possible. At an unknown date, railing blocks were removed from the north side of the deck, and a bracketed walkway was added, giving more lateral clearance. Little work had been done on the viaduct until the repairs of 1937 and 1938, which, according to a 1949 report by the Chief Engineer of the B&O, would keep future maintenance to a minimum.

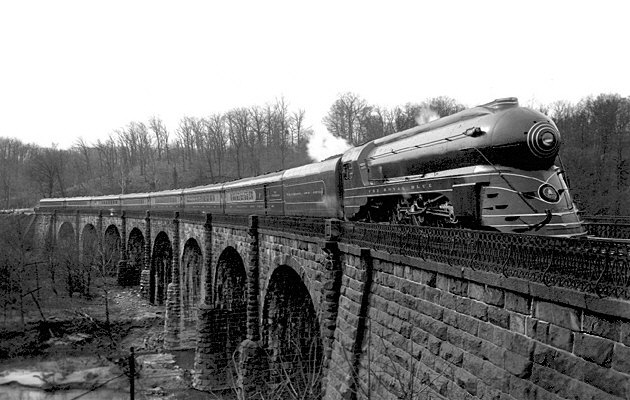
The Royal Blue on the Thomas Viaduct, Relay, Maryland, in 1937

From the 1880s to the 1950s, Thomas Viaduct carried B&O's famed Royal Blue Line passenger trains between New York and Washington. Until the late 1960s, the bridge also carried B&O passenger trains traveling to points west of Washington, such as the Capital Limited to Chicago and the National Limited to St. Louis.

With the advent of Amtrak on May 1, 1971, B&O ended its passenger train service, except for local Baltimore and Washington commuter trains. In 1986, CSX acquired the B&O and all of its trackage, including the Thomas Viaduct. Today, MARC's "Camden Line" train service runs daily trains over the Viaduct. See Capital Subdivision.

== Legacy ==
"Austrian, Franz Anton von Gerstner, in his "Zweig- Bahn Nach Washington," described the Thomas Viaduct as one of the most beautiful and best-designed bridges in the United States and went into details. The Frenchman, Michel Chevalier, included it in the few "Travaux d'Art" constructed by railroads in this country." (Cullen,1957)

During design and construction, the Thomas Viaduct was nicknamed "Latrobe's Folly" after the designer Benjamin Latrobe II because, at the time, many doubted that it could even support its own weight. Contrary to these predictions, the Thomas Viaduct survived the great flood of 1868 as well as Hurricane Agnes in 1972, two floods that wiped out the Patapsco Valley and destroyed nearly everything in their path; and to this day, it continues to carry 300-ton (270 tonne) diesel locomotives passengers and heavy freight traffic.

The bridge was designated a National Historic Landmark on January 28, 1964, and administratively listed on the National Register of Historic Places on October 15, 1966. In 2010, the bridge was designated as a National Historic Civil Engineering Landmark by the American Society of Civil Engineers.

In 2014 and 2015, the non-profit historic preservation organization Preservation Howard County placed the Viaduct on its list of the top 10 endangered historic places in Howard County. The Patapsco Heritage Greenway group announced plans to add handrails to the bridge in 2015.

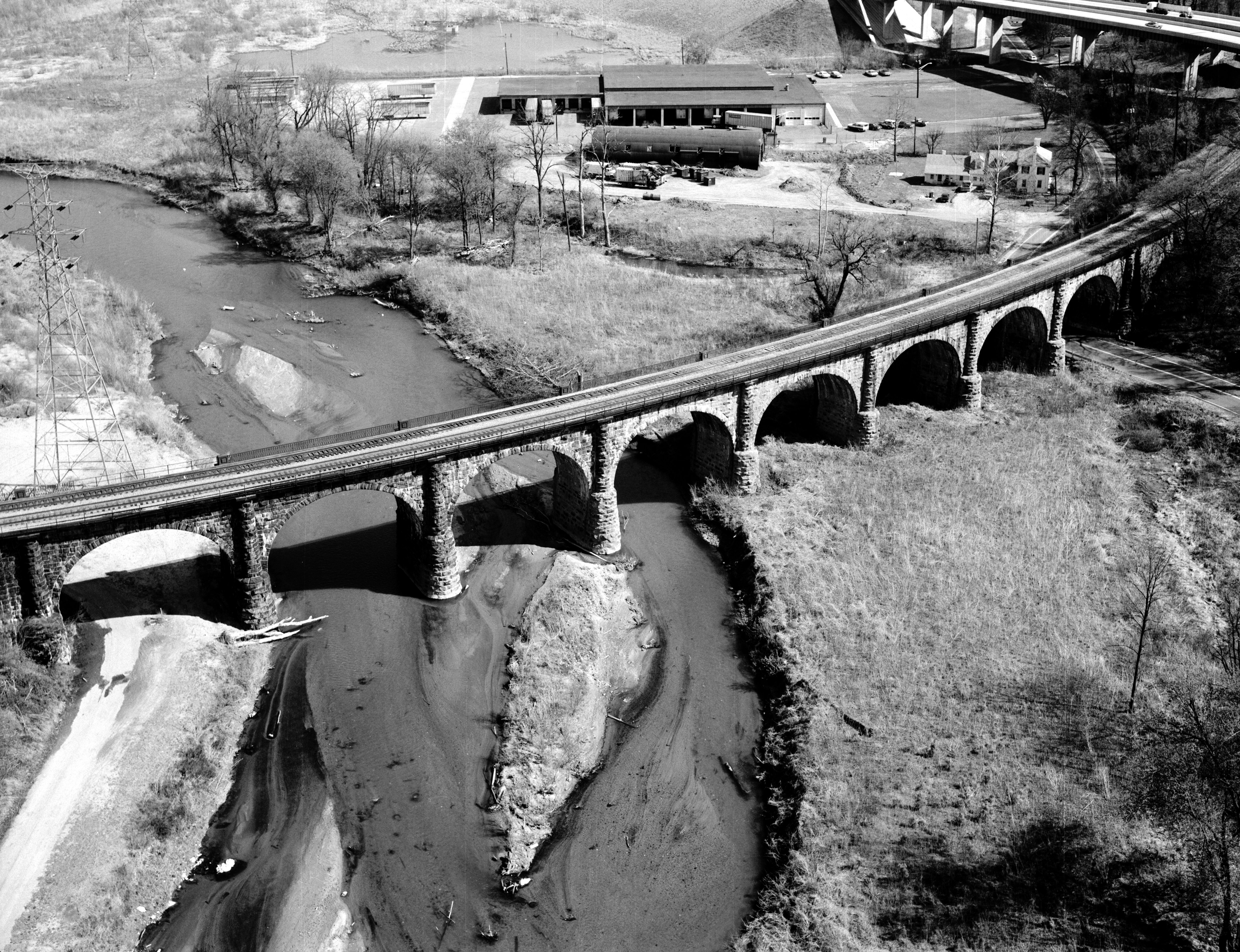
Aerial view, c. 1977

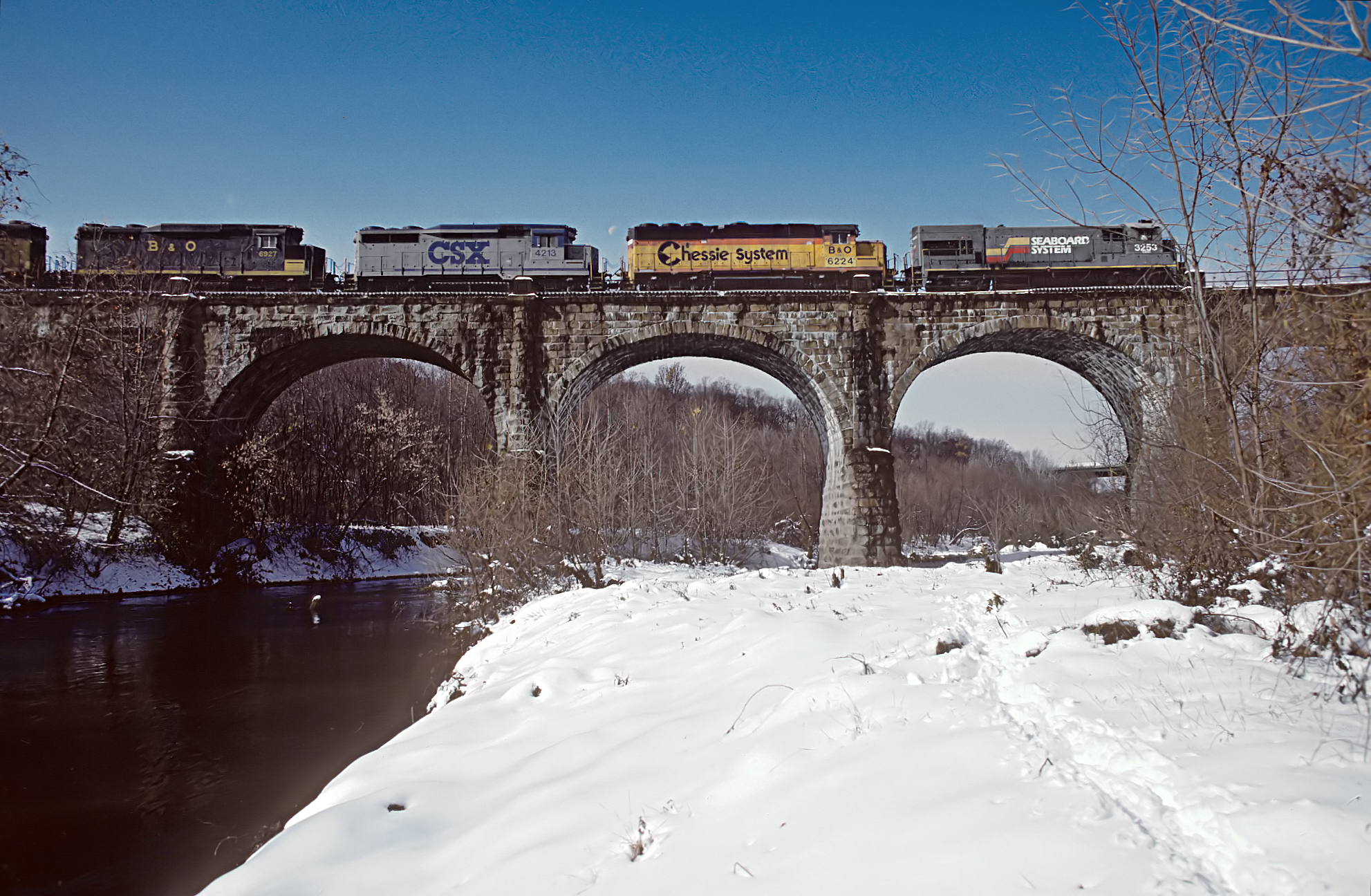
1987

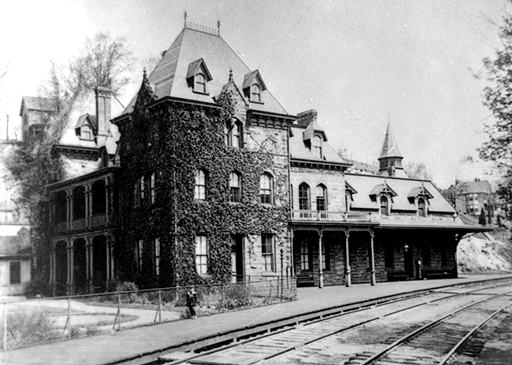
The Viaduct Hotel, 1910

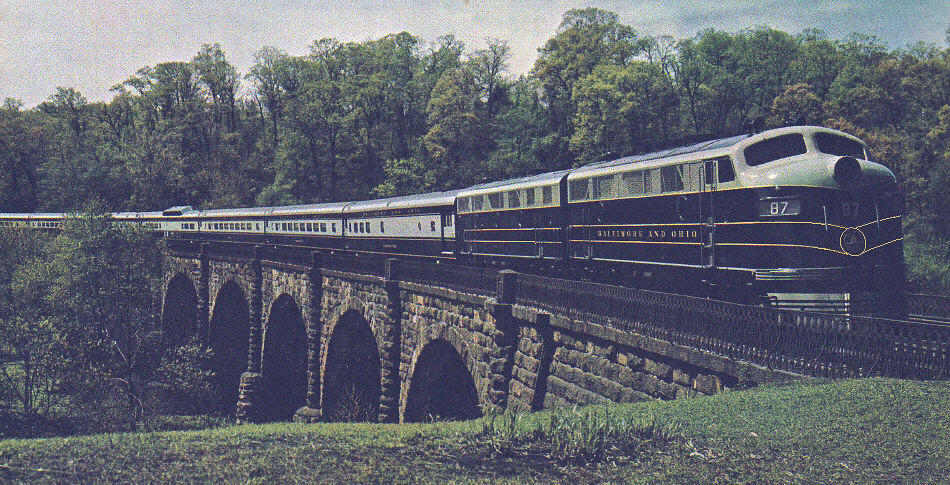
B&O's Columbian, 1949

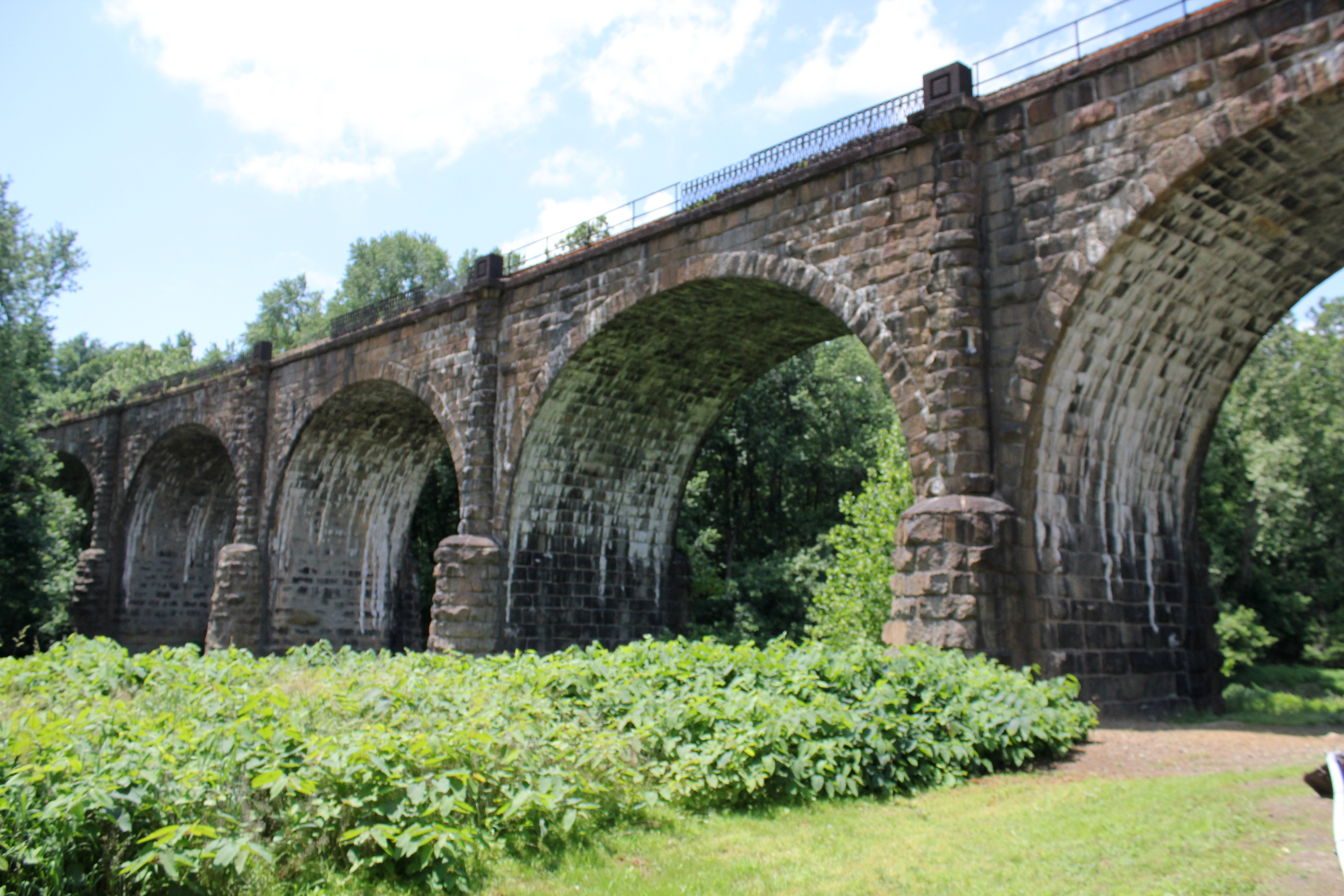
The Thomas Viaduct as seen in 2011

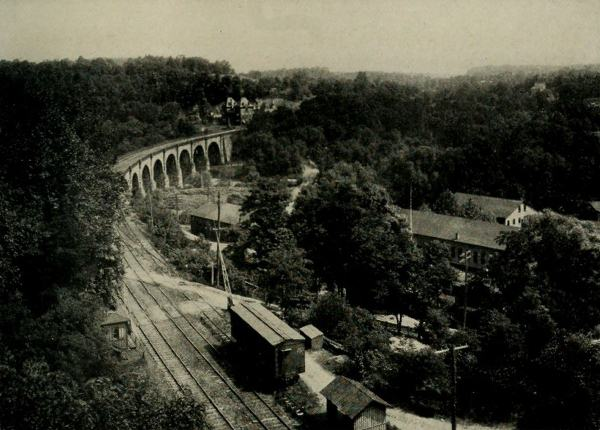
Thomas Viaduct

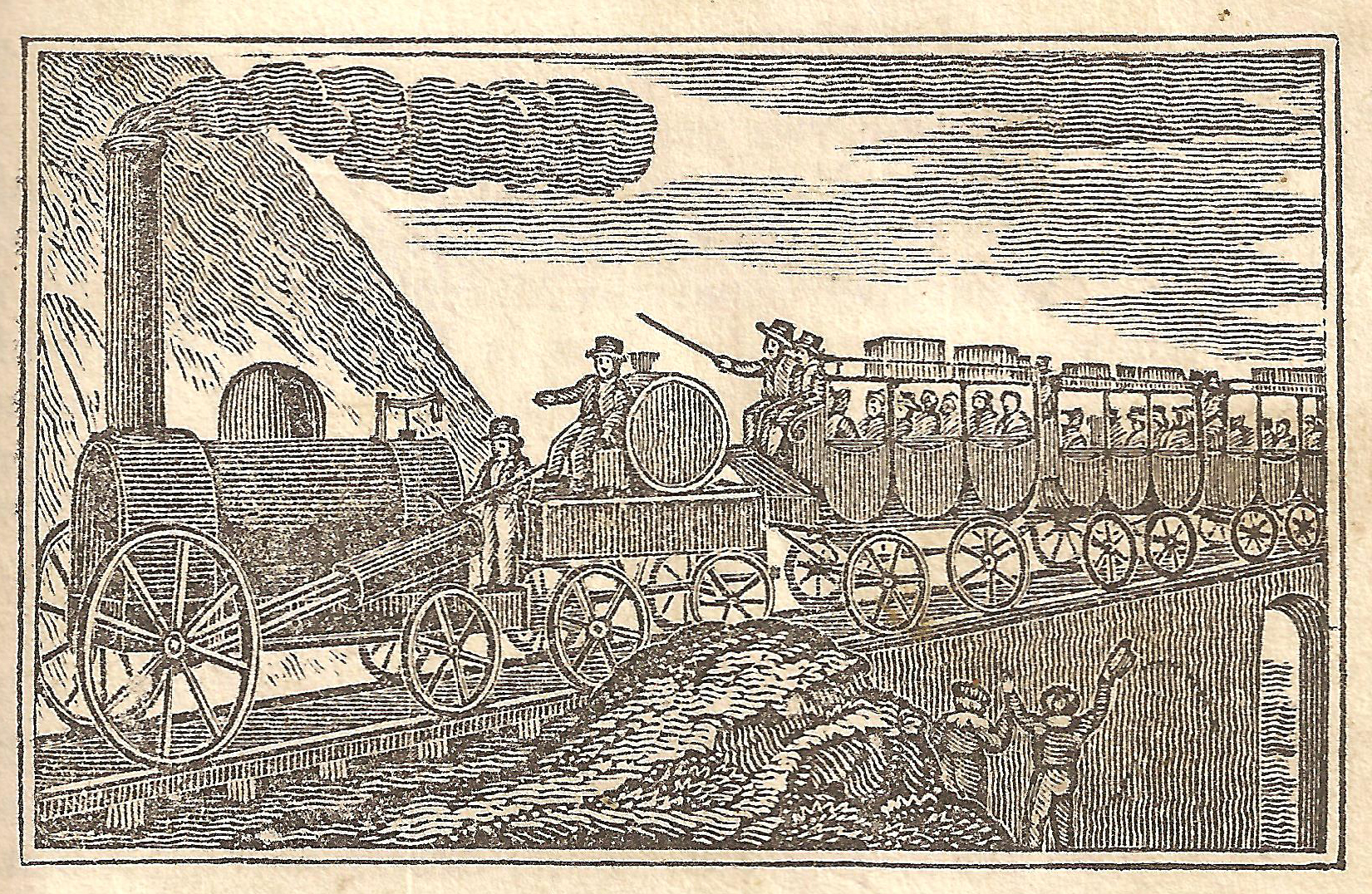
This illustration appears in a book printed in 1835, the year the viaduct opened.

== See also ==
- Hockley Forge and Mill Industrial development around viaduct
- Patterson Viaduct - one of John McCartney's earlier works.
- Bloede dam - a former historical hydroelectric dam located within the same park as the Thomas Viaduct.
- List of bridges documented by the Historic American Engineering Record in Maryland
- List of bridges on the National Register of Historic Places in Maryland
- List of Howard County properties in the Maryland Historical Trust
