= Bloede Dam =

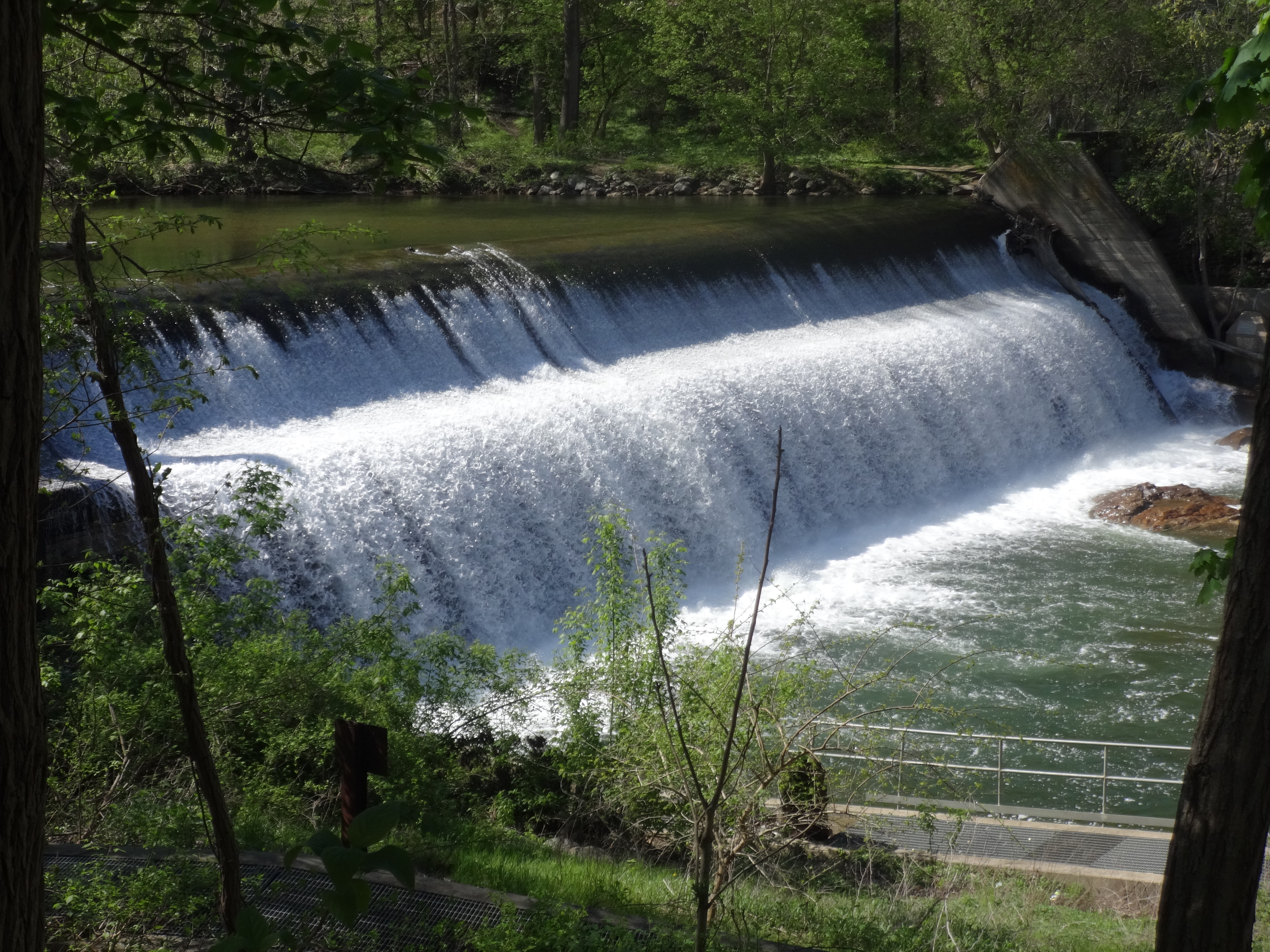
- Bloede Dam on 15 April 2015
- Interactive map of Bloede Dam
- Official name: Bloede Dam
- Location: Catonsville / Ilchester, Maryland
- Coordinates: 39.247023°N 76.761083°W
- Opening date: 1907
- Demolition date: September 2018
- Operator: Maryland DNR

Dam and spillways
- Impounds: Patapsco River
- Height: 26 1/2 feet (8.1 m)
- Length: 220 feet (67 m)
- Width (base): 40 feet (12 m)

Bloede Dam was a hydroelectric dam on the Patapsco River in Maryland. Built in 1906, it was the first submerged hydroelectric plant—that is, the power plant was housed under the spillway. It was also one of the earliest dams constructed of reinforced concrete. Its site is now part of Patapsco Valley State Park upstream from the Orange Grove area. The dam was breached in 2018, with removal complete by 2019.

== History and design ==
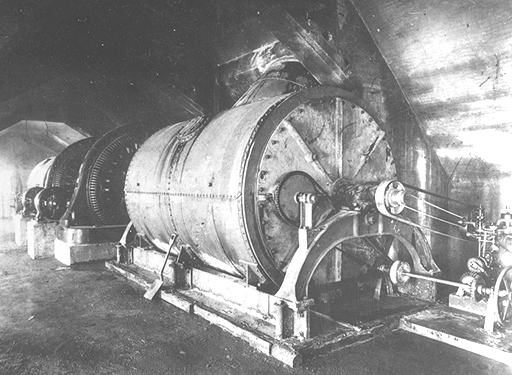
The 34-inch Poole & Hunt Leffel Wheels and the 30-inch Samson Turbine

The Patapsco Electric and Manufacturing company, of Ellicott City, brought fame to the Patapsco River corridor in 1906 when it constructed the world's first underwater hydroelectric plant to supply its electricity. The dam is named for Victor Gustav Bloede (pronounced as Blerda), a German immigrant who founded the nearby Avalon Water Works. Bloede hired electrical engineer Otto Wonder to oversee the development of this unique hydroelectric project near Gray's Mill on the Patapsco River. Construction was performed by the Emmerson Ferro-Concrete company of Boston. The dam itself was 220 feet (67 m) long, 40 feet (12 m) wide at the base and had a drop of 26.5 feet (8.1 m). It was an Ambursen Hydraulic Construction Company (Boston-type) reinforced concrete slab and buttress dam. The power plant technology and equipment were state of the art when it went into operation in 1907, with 34-inch Poole & Hunt Leffel Wheels and two 30-inch 500 hp horizontal Samson Turbines capable of an electromotive force of 11,000 volts. A 200-foot fish ladder was constructed along the site. The arrangement made the facility the world's first underwater hydroelectric plant.

In its original plan, the plant was meant as an independent competitor to the local electric companies, and supplied power to the surrounding towns of Illchester, Ellicott City and Catonsville many of which were outside of the utilities' service area. It replaced an earlier 300 hp plant purchased for $12,000 in 1900 two miles away at Gray's mills that employed a millrace with a bevel gear and rope drive. The $175,000 electric generation equipment was engaged on 28 November 1908 at 3:30pm by Victor Bloede's daughter, Miss Vida Bloede. Waffles were served to 500 dignitaries and guests from electric waffle makers.

The new Maryland Public Service Commission refused to grant Bloede a franchise to compete in electricity generation. Bloede claimed that Consolidated was attempting to force a sale because the company was charging less on street light contracts with Catonsville and Baltimore. In 1913, the plant was sold to Consolidated Gas Electric Light and Power, a predecessor company of Constellation Energy for $200,000 in stock. Consolidated constructed a new head gate and sluice after the purchase. The dam continued to generate electrical power within its interior until 1924 when it was closed due to the competition of larger, more powerful plants. The 38 acre property was sold to the State of Maryland on July 22, 1938, on the condition that the property would not be resold to competition to generate electricity or be developed. Although the dam was severely damaged by the flood of Hurricane Agnes 1972, its ruins still stand, although the dam has been gutted leaving only a mud-filled shell. The gatehouse structures were removed since the storm left them unsafe. A semi-exposed sewer line remains onsite. In 1979, the state of Maryland budgeted $30,000 to investigate stabilizing the dam. In 1992, the Department of Natural Resources added a $1.58 million fish ladder to allow migrating fish to swim upstream without being blocked by the dam. More controversy has risen about the American eel in that the dam blocks their passage as well.

== Removal ==
The removal of Bloede Dam started in September 2017 with work expected to be completed by the spring of 2019. An $8 million request for proposal was prepared by American Rivers nonprofit in 2016 to demolish the dam to expose and remove 1,700 feet of non-supported sewer pipe situated on silt built up behind the facility. Silt was expected to overload river two years before recovery. The removal of the dam was expected to remove a hazard where nine deaths occurred since the 1980s, to be replaced with a swift shallow rocky area for kayaking. Two upstream dams, Simkins and Union, were removed in 2011 and 2010, respectively. Removal of Bloede Dam left Daniels Dam as the last remaining dam along the main branch of the Patapsco River.

The Bloede Dam as it once stood in ca. 1907

== See also ==
- List of dam removals in Maryland
- Patapsco Valley State Park
- List of Maryland state parks

== Footnotes and references ==
Much of the information found here was provided by the Baltimore County Public Library.
