= List of dam removals in Tennessee =

This is a list of dams in Tennessee that have been removed as physical impediments to free-flowing rivers or streams.

== Removals by watershed ==
=== Cumberland River ===
Several tributaries of the Cumberland River have seen dam removals. Metro Nashville removed an irrigation dam at McCabe Golf Course from Richland Creek in 2014. A cinder block dam on Sevenmile Creek behind the Edmondson Pike Branch Library was removed in 2015 to support the endangered Nashville crayfish, 580 of which were relocated ahead of demolition. The Nashville Zoo at Grassmere removed two small dams on the Cathy Jo Branch in 2017. Also removed that year was a fish barrier owned by the Tennessee Wildlife Resources Agency meant to keep rough fish from Cordell Hull Lake out of the Roaring River.

=== Elk River ===
==== Proposed removals ====
The Harms Mill Dam is the only major barrier on the Elk River. The Tennessee Wildlife Resources Agency is leading a project to remove the dam, which has been awarded $500,000 from the National Fish Passage Program. This would result in 1,114 mi (1,793 km) stream miles opened to aquatic migration, support the round hickorynut and 45 other species of greatest conservation need, and increase safety for boaters.

== Completed removals ==
Dam	Height	Year removed	Location	Watercourse	Watershed
Nashville Zoo Dam Weir 1	4 ft (1.2 m)	2017	Nashville; 36.0896°N 86.7364°W	Cathy Jo Branch	Cumberland River
Nashville Zoo Dam Weir 2	4 ft (1.2 m)	2017	Nashville; 36.0897°N 86.7349°W	Cathy Jo Branch	Cumberland River
Chandler Cove Dam	3 ft (0.91 m)	2018	Nashville; 36.0237°N 86.6732°W	Mill Creek	Cumberland River
Culbertson Road Dam	5 ft (1.5 m)	2018	Nashville; 36.0128°N 86.685°W	Mill Creek	Cumberland River
McRedmond Dam	5 ft (1.5 m)	2018	Nashville; 36.1407°N 86.7147°W	Mill Creek	Cumberland River
McCabe Golf Course Dam	5 ft (1.5 m)	2014	Nashville; 36.1386°N 86.8497°W	Richland Creek	Cumberland River
Sevenmile Dam	4 ft (1.2 m)	2015	Nashville; 36.0454°N 86.7458°W	Sevenmile Creek	Cumberland River
Roaring River Fish Dam	10 ft (3.0 m)	2017	Gainesboro; 36.3531°N 85.5991°W	Roaring River	Cumberland River
Harpeth River Dam		2012	Franklin; 35.9089°N 86.8546°W	Harpeth River	Harpeth River
Occidental Chem Pond Dam D	160 ft (49 m)	1995	Williamsport; 35.7061°N 87.225°W	Duck Creek	Duck River
Monsanto Dam #7	78 ft (24 m)	1990	Columbia; 35.6549°N 87.0923°W	Duck River	Duck River
Tailings Pond No. 7 Dam		1990	Maury County; 35.6545°N 87.0941°W	Tributary to Duck River	Duck River
Monsanto Dam #3	39 ft (12 m)	1988	Columbia; 35.6698°N 87.1237°W	Tributary to Duck River	Duck River
Monsanto Dam #4	53 ft (16 m)	1990	Columbia; 35.6652°N 87.1092°W	Greenlick Creek	Duck River
Monsanto Dam #5A	52 ft (16 m)	1990	Columbia; 35.659°N 87.1141°W	Greenlick Creek	Duck River
Monsanto Dam #9	33 ft (10 m)	1990	Columbia; 35.6611°N 87.1351°W	Helms Branch	Duck River
Rhone Poulenc Dam #20	33 ft (10 m)	1995	Mt. Pleasant; 35.5496°N 87.1756°W	Quality Creek	Duck River
Occidental Chem Dam #6	53 ft (16 m)	1991	Columbia; 35.6498°N 87.0333°W	Tributary to Rutherford Creek	Duck River
Hooker No. 6 Dam		1991	Maury County; 35.65°N 87.032°W	Tributary to Rutherford Creek	Duck River
Walkers Dam	32 ft (9.8 m)	1992	Columbia; 35.667°N 87.0077°W	Walker Stream	Duck River
Gin House Lake Dam	32 ft (9.8 m)	1994	Munford; 35.4771°N 89.8068°W	Adkinson Creek	Hatchie River
Upper Citico Creek Dam	7 ft (2.1 m)	2015	Monroe County; 35.4202°N 84.0929°W	Citico Creek	Little Tennessee River
Ballard Mill Mine Dam	30 ft (9.1 m)	1992	Sweetwater; 35.6048°N 84.389°W	Tributary to Fork Creek	Little Tennessee River
Spence Farm Pond Dam #5	35 ft (11 m)	1983	Adamsville; 35.2033°N 88.3675°W	Tributary to Snake Creek	Tennessee River
Bales Mill Dam			Greene County; 36.1387°N 82.7601°W	Holly Creek	Nolichucky River
Lake Deforest Dam	36 ft (11 m)	1991	Oakfield; 35.7093°N 88.7691°W	Johnson Creek	Forked Deer River
London's Mill Dam (Tailings Pond Dam)	106 ft (32 m)	1995	Polk County; 35.0424°N 84.3665°W	Burra-Burra Creek	Ocoee River
Cities Service Company Dam	30 ft (9.1 m)	1995	Turtletown; 35.0405°N 84.3667°W	Burra-Burra Creek	Ocoee River
Brown's Mill Dam	2 ft (0.61 m)	2014	Lascassas; 35.902°N 86.281°W	East Fork Stones River	Stones River
Eblen-Powell Dam #1	32 ft (9.8 m)		LaFollette; 36.389°N 84.1389°W	Ollis Creek	Clinch River
L. Thompson Dam #1	10 ft (3.0 m)	1990			
L.C. Hancock Dam #1	8 ft (2.4 m)	1990			

== Planned and proposed removals ==
Dam	Expected year	Location	Watercourse	Watershed
Harms Mill Dam		Lincoln County; 35.1506°N 86.6487°W	Elk River	Elk River

== See also ==
- List of dam removals in Alabama
- List of dam removals in Georgia (U.S. state)
- List of dam removals in North Carolina
- List of dam removals in Virginia
