= List of dams and reservoirs in Maryland =

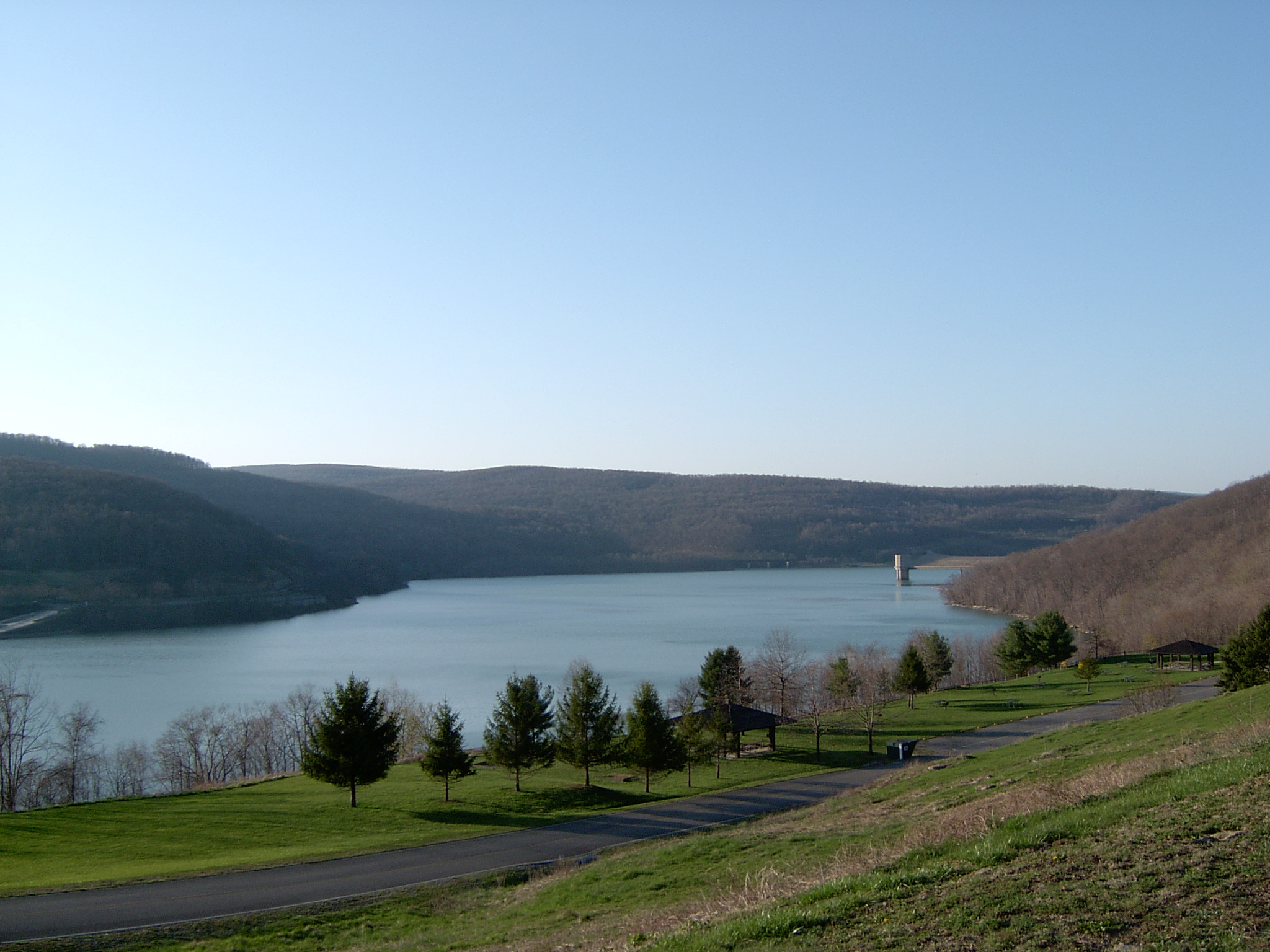
Jennings Randolph Lake

Following is a list of dams and reservoirs in Maryland.

All major dams are linked below. The National Inventory of Dams defines any "major dam" as being 50 feet (15 m) tall with a storage capacity of at least 5,000 acre-feet (6,200,000 m^{3}), or of any height with a storage capacity of 25,000 acre-feet (31,000,000 m^{3}).

== Dams and reservoirs in Maryland ==
This list is incomplete. You can help Wikipedia by expanding it.

- Brighton Dam, Triadelphia Reservoir, Alternative Energy Associates Ltd. Partnership
- Burnt Mills Dam, Robert B. Morse Filtration Plant, Washington Suburban Sanitary Commission
- Conowingo Dam, Conowingo Reservoir, Susquehanna Power Co. & Philadelphia Electric Co.
- Cumberland Dam, unnamed reservoir on the Potomac River, privately owned (on West Virginia border)
- Deep Creek Dam, Deep Creek Lake, Pennsylvania Electric Company
- Jennings Randolph Dam, Jennings Randolph Lake, United States Army Corps of Engineers (on the West Virginia border)
- Liberty Dam, Liberty Reservoir, Baltimore City Department of Public Works
- Little Seneca Dam, Little Seneca Lake, Washington Suburban Sanitary Commission
- Loch Raven Dam, Loch Raven Reservoir, Baltimore City Department of Public Works
- Piney Run Dam, Piney Run Reservoir, Carroll County, Maryland
- Prettyboy Dam, Prettyboy Reservoir, Baltimore City Department of Public Works
- Rocky Gap Dam, Lake Habeeb, Maryland Department of Natural Resources
- Rocky Gorge Dam, Rocky Gorge Reservoir, Washington Suburban Sanitary Commission
- Savage River Dam, Savage River Reservoir, Upper Potomac River Commission

== See also ==
- List of dam removals in Maryland
