= Pine Knot =

Pine Knot may refer to:

- Pine Knot (cabin), a cabin in Virginia owned by Theodore Roosevelt
- Pine Knot, Kentucky, U.S.
- Pine Knot Creek, Georgia, U.S.
- Camp Pine Knot, in the Adirondack Mountains of New York, U.S.
- Fatwood or pine knot, the heartwood of pine trees

== See also ==
- Pine Knob (disambiguation)
