= List of dam removals in North Carolina =

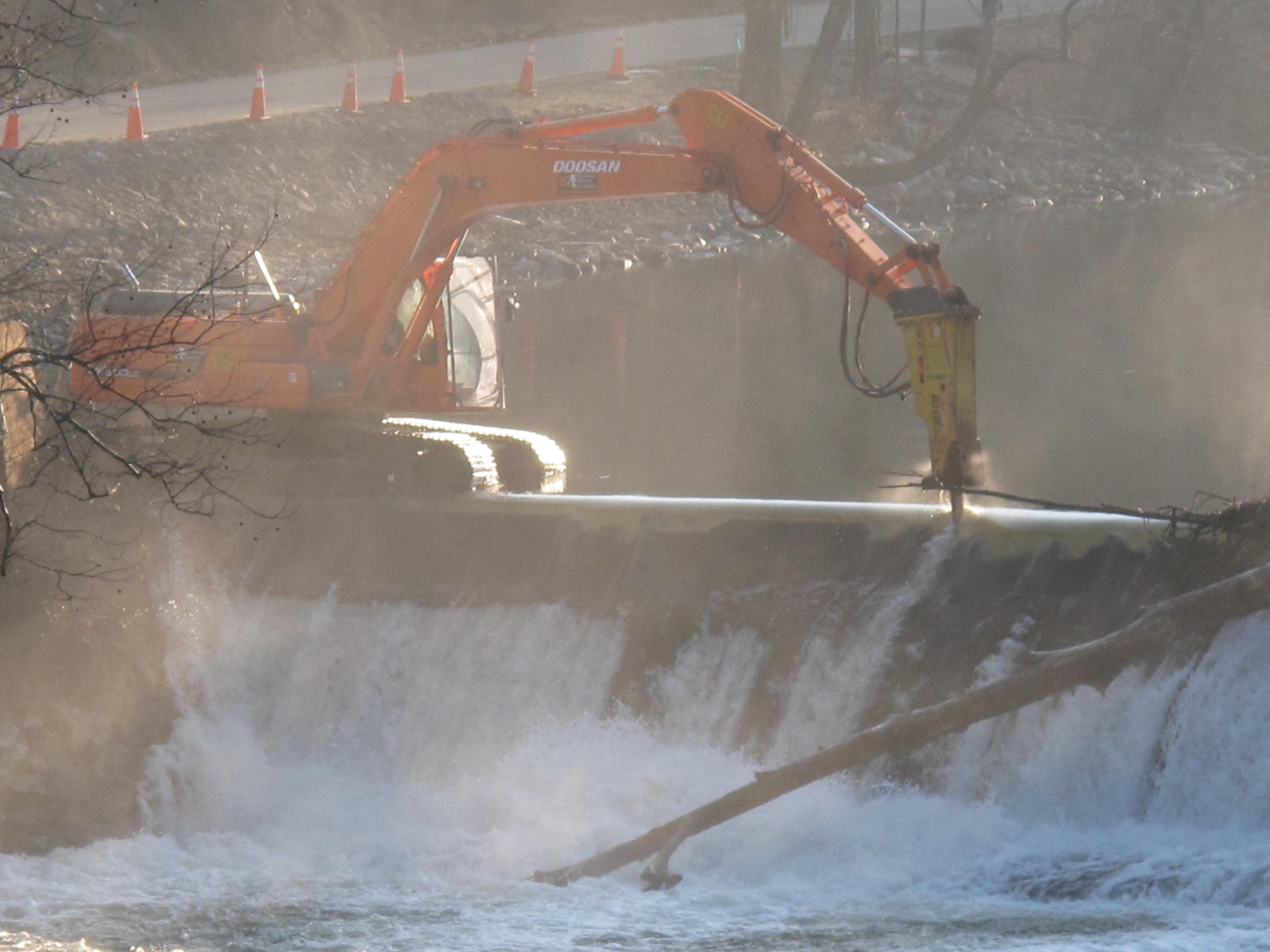
The 2010 removal of the Dillsboro Dam from the Tuckasegee River in Dillsboro

This is a list of dams in North Carolina that have been removed as physical impediments to free-flowing rivers or streams.

== Completed removals ==
Dam	Height	Year removed	Location	Watercourse	Watershed
Lower Big Hungry Dam	40 ft (12 m)	2015	Henderson; 35.2931°N 82.3558°W	Hungry River	Broad River
Buckhorn Dam		2010	Sanford; 35.5314°N 78.9755°W	Buckhorn Creek	Cape Fear River
Harnett Metals Dam	16 ft (4.9 m)	1999	Harnett County; 35.2215°N 78.9453°W	Tributary to Jumping Run Creek	Cape Fear River
Phillips Creek Dam	19 ft (5.8 m)	2014	Bladen County; 34.7389°N 78.7516°W	Philips Creek	Cape Fear River
Windermere Dam	20 ft (6.1 m)		Mecklenburg County; 35.091°N 80.813°W	Tributary to McAlpine Creek	Catawba River
Shuford Mill Dam	35 ft (11 m)	2016	Brookford; 35.7013°N 81.3474°W	Henry Fork River	Catawba River
Rowland Lake Lower Dam (Ray Durham Lower Dam)	26 ft (7.9 m)	2004	Gaston County; 35.3417°N 81.1156°W	Tributary to Mauney Creek	Catawba River
Walker Pond Dam	16 ft (4.9 m)	2006	Burke County; 35.7157°N 81.7258°W	Tributary to Bailey Fork	Catawba River
Lady Marion Dam	26 ft (7.9 m)	2019	McDowell County; 35.6939°N 82.0256°W	Garden Creek	Catawba River
Carbonton Dam		2005	Carbonton; 35.5198°N 79.3471°W	Deep River	Deep River
Deep River Farm Dam	20 ft (6.1 m)		Guilford County; 36.0369°N 79.9521°W	Tributary to East Fork Deep River	Deep River
Hoosier Dam (Reeves Lake Dam)	25 ft (7.6 m)	2018	Chatham County; 35.6356°N 79.2111°W	Rocky River	Deep River
Rush Mountain Dam	15 ft (4.6 m)	2017	Henderson; 35.2459°N 82.4702°W	Greer Creek	French Broad River
Lake Craig Dam	20 ft (6.1 m)	1952	Buncombe County; 35.5819°N 82.4932°W	Swannanoa River	French Broad River
Granite Mill Dam	2 ft (0.61 m)	2016	Haw River; 36.0905°N 79.3695°W	Haw River	Haw River
Granite Mill Dam 2		2016	Haw River; 36.0905°N 79.3695°W	Haw River	Haw River
Granite Mill Dam 3		2016	Haw River; 36.0905°N 79.3695°W	Haw River	Haw River
Upper Swepsonville Dam (Puryear Dam)	3.5 ft (1.1 m)	2013	Swepsonville; 36.0239°N 79.3663°W	Haw River	Haw River
White Oak Lake Dam	21 ft (6.4 m)		Guilford County; 36.1085°N 79.7671°W	Tributary to North Buffalo Creek	Haw River
A D W Dam	11 ft (3.4 m)		Guilford County; 36.045°N 79.833°W	Tributary to South Buffalo Creek	Haw River
Shuler Creek Dam	4 ft (1.2 m)	2020	Cherokee County; 35.181°N 84.2908°W	Shuler Creek	Hiwassee River
Little Buck Creek Pond Dam	30 ft (9.1 m)	2016	Clay County; 35.0605°N 83.5718°W	Little Tennessee River	Little Tennessee River
Forney Ridge Dam		1988	Great Smoky Mountains National Park; 35.5211°N 83.5429°W	Forney Creek	Little Tennessee River
Dillsboro Dam	12 ft (3.7 m)	2010	Dillsboro; 35.3665°N 83.25°W	Tuckasegee River	Little Tennessee River
Santeetlah Fish Barrier	8 ft (2.4 m)	2016	Graham County; 35.3668°N 83.9153°W	Santeetlah Creek	Little Tennessee River
Eno Dam		2007	Orange County; 36.0473°N 79.0109°W	Eno River	Neuse River
Ailey Young Park Dam		2019	Wake Forest; 35.9808°N 78.4961°W	Tributary to Dunn Creek	Neuse River
Cherry Hospital Dam	7 ft (2.1 m)	1998	Goldsboro; 35.3916°N 78.0261°W	Little River	Neuse River
Lowell Dam	10 ft (3.0 m)	2006	Kenly; 35.566°N 78.1602°W	Little River	Neuse River
Rains Mill Dam		1999	Princeton; 35.4822°N 78.1437°W	Little River	Neuse River
Temple Sloan Dam (Whitley Dam)	19 ft (5.8 m)	2002	Wake County; 35.7777°N 78.4411°W	Marks Creek	Neuse River
Crantock Mill Dam	10 ft (3.0 m)	2008	Smithfield; 35.5227°N 78.4668°W	Middle Creek	Neuse River
Milburnie Dam	15 ft (4.6 m)	2017	Wake County; 35.8004°N 78.5396°W	Neuse River	Neuse River
Quaker Neck Dam	7 ft (2.1 m)	1998	Wayne County; 35.367°N 78.083°W	Neuse River	Neuse River
Payne Branch Dam	20 ft (6.1 m)	2020	Watauga County; 36.1841°N 81.6523°W	Middle Fork South Fork New River	New River
Cane River Dam	45 ft (14 m)	2016	Burnsville; 35.9039°N 82.3319°W	Cane River	Nolichucky River
Plumtree Dam		1993	Avery County; 36.0258°N 82.0095°W	North Toe River	Nolichucky River
Altapass Dam		2010	Pisgah National Forest; 35.8886°N 81.9863°W	Roses Creek	Nolichucky River
Spruce Pine Dam	10 ft (3.0 m)	2009	Spruce Pine; 35.923°N 82.0887°W	Toe River	Nolichucky River
Old Troy Dam No. 2		2013	Montgomery County; 35.3874°N 79.8681°W	Densons Creek	Pee Dee River
Troy Dam No. 1	6 ft (1.8 m)	2012	Troy; 35.3872°N 79.868°W	Densons Creek	Pee Dee River
Chandlers Dynamo Dam	5 ft (1.5 m)	2012	Troy; 35.368°N 79.838°W	Little River	Pee Dee River
Smitherman's Dam	12 ft (3.7 m)	2013	Troy; 35.3437°N 79.853°W	Little River	Pee Dee River
Baucom Lake Dam	15 ft (4.6 m)		Union County; 35.041°N 80.5043°W	Flag Branch	Pee Dee River
Freedom Park Dam	10 ft (3.0 m)	2002	Norwood; 35.194°N 80.1031°W	Little Sugar Creek	Pee Dee River
Steele's Mill Dam	15 ft (4.6 m)	2009	Richmond County; 34.9195°N 79.8288°W	Hitchcock Creek	Pee Dee River
Yellow Jacket Lake Dam	26 ft (7.9 m)		Wilkes County; 36.094°N 81.195°W	Moravian Creek	Pee Dee River
Baker Dam (Miller Dam)	19 ft (5.8 m)		Forsyth County; 36.115°N 80.13°W	Tributary to Smith Creek	Pee Dee River
Watts Lake Dam	31 ft (9.4 m)	1997	Alexander County; 36.0289°N 81.1334°W	Tributary to South Yadkin River	Pee Dee River
Lassiter Mill Dam	12 ft (3.7 m)	2013	Randolph County; 35.5644°N 79.973°W	Uwharrie River	Pee Dee River
Hutchens Dam	23 ft (7.0 m)	1998	Randolph County; 35.874°N 80.002°W	Tributary to Uwharrie River	Pee Dee River
Ash Bear Pen Dam	10 ft (3.0 m)	1990	Blowing Rock; 36.1299°N 81.7679°W	Cold Prong Creek	Watauga River
Yonahlossee Dam			Watauga County; 36.1716°N 81.7161°W	Lance Creek	Watauga River
Ward Mill Dam	20 ft (6.1 m)	2021	Watauga County; 36.2413°N 81.8304°W	Watauga River	Watauga River
Unnamed dam	3 ft (0.91 m)	2009	Watauga County	Sims Creek	Watauga River
Umstead Dam		2016		Cape Fear Basin	

== See also ==
- List of dam removals in Georgia (U.S. state)
- List of dam removals in South Carolina
- List of dam removals in Tennessee
- List of dam removals in Virginia
