= List of dam removals in Washington, D.C. =

This is a list of dams in Washington, D.C. that have been removed as physical impediments to free-flowing rivers or streams.

== Completed removals ==
Dam	Height	Year removed	Location	Watercourse	Watershed
Millrace Dam	18 ft (5.5 m)		Washington	Rock Creek	Potomac River
Ford Dam #3		1991	Washington	Rock Creek	Potomac River
Unnamed Ford #2	3 ft (0.91 m)	2003	Washington	Rock Creek	Potomac River
Unnamed Ford #1	3 ft (0.91 m)	2004	Washington	Rock Creek	Potomac River

== See also ==
- List of dam removals in Maryland
- List of dam removals in Virginia
