= List of dam removals in Georgia (U.S. state) =

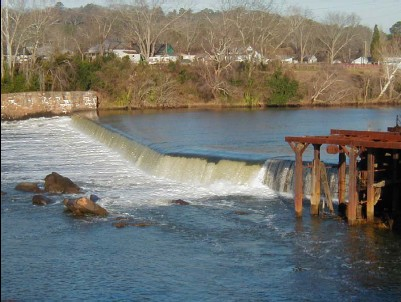
The City Mills Dam on the Chattahoochee River in Columbus, removed in 2013

This is a list of dams in Georgia that have been removed as physical impediments to free-flowing rivers or streams.

== Removals by watershed ==
=== Chattahoochee River ===
Two major dams have been removed from the Chattahoochee River in Columbus, Georgia, on the border with Alabama. The Eagle & Phenix Dam was demolished in 2012 and the City Mills Dam in 2013. The removals made way for a whitewater kayaking course.

==== Proposed removals ====
In 2018, Georgia Power filed to decommission and remove three additional outdated hydroelectric dams on the Chattahoochee: Langdale Dam, Crow Hop Dam, and Riverview Dam.

== Completed removals ==
Dam	Height	Year removed	Location	Watercourse	Watershed
Gray's Landing Dam	19 ft (5.8 m)		Toombs County; 31.9686°N 82.4311°W	Horn Creek	Altamaha River
Sallacoa Creek Watershed Dam #77	56 ft (17 m)	2018	Gordon County; 34.5258°N 84.6974°W	Lick Creek	Coosa River
Wehadkee Farms Mitigation Bank		2008	Heard County; 33.203°N 85.2304°W	Little Wehadkee Creek	Chattahoochee River
Hogansville Mitigation Bank		2007	Troup County; 33.201°N 84.9161°W	Tributary to Yellowjack Creek	Chattahoochee River
Eagle & Phenix Dam	17 ft (5.2 m)	2012	Columbus; 32.4698°N 84.9976°W	Chattahoochee River	Chattahoochee River
City Mills Dam	10 ft (3.0 m)	2013	Columbus; 32.4801°N 84.9944°W	Chattahoochee River	Chattahoochee River
Unnamed dam		2019	Marion County; 32.5201°N 84.577°W	Tributary to Juniper Creek	Chattahoochee River
Estimated Dam 1729		2019	Marion County; 32.5219°N 84.5774°W	Tributary to Juniper Creek	Chattahoochee River
Estimated Dam 1727		2019	Marion County; 32.4073°N 84.6519°W	Tributary to Pine Knot Creek	Chattahoochee River
Oklahoma Avenue Mitigation Bank		2008	Lumpkin County; 34.5179°N 84.0209°W	Crooked Creek	Chattahoochee River
Soque River Mitigation Bank		2012	Habersham County; 34.6269°N 83.5288°W	Tributary to Soque River	Chattahoochee River
Wauka Mountain Mitigation Bank	8 ft (2.4 m)	2008	White County; 34.5165°N 83.8274°W	West Fork Little River	Chattahoochee River
Decatur Waterworks Dam (Mason Mill Dam)		1965	DeKalb County; 33.8055°N 84.3037°W	Burnt Fork Creek	Chattahoochee River
Millers Millpond Dam	12 ft (3.7 m)		Burke County; 33.2173°N 81.8762°W	Boggy Gut Creek	Savannah River
Brushy Creek Mitigation Bank (Double D Ranch Lake Dam)		2007	Burke County; 33.198°N 82.2239°W	Brushy Creek	Savannah River
East Swift Creek Mitigation Bank		2008	Upson County; 32.8575°N 84.2518°W	East Swift Creek	Flint River
Lamberth Lake Dam			Fayette County; 33.4239°N 84.4503°W	Tributary to Perry Creek	Flint River
Carl Neisler Lake Dam	16 ft (4.9 m)		Taylor County; 32.6539°N 84.2221°W	Little Patsiliga Creek	Flint River
Jackson Farms Mitigation Bank		2018	Mitchell County; 31.0961°N 84.0785°W	Pond Creek	Ochlockonee River
Little Sandy Creek Mitigation Bank		2009	Butts County; 33.2286°N 83.8668°W	Little Sandy Creek	Ocmulgee River
Riyadh Lake Dam #1 (West Dam)	30 ft (9.1 m)	2009	Butts County; 33.2283°N 83.8673°W	Little Sandy Creek	Ocmulgee River
Riyadh Lake Dam #2 (Middle Dam)	33 ft (10 m)	2009	Butts County; 33.2293°N 83.8639°W	Little Sandy Creek	Ocmulgee River
Athens Waterworks Pond Dam	44 ft (13 m)	2019	Athens; 33.9793°N 83.3744°W	Tributary to Sandy Creek	Oconee River
White Dam	14.5 ft (4.4 m)	2018	Athens; 33.8776°N 83.3514°W	Middle Oconee River	Oconee River

== Planned and proposed removals ==
Dam	Expected year	Location	Watercourse	Watershed
Langdale Dam		Harris County; 32.8156°N 85.1653°W	Chatahoochee River	Chatahoochee River
Crow Hop Dam		Harris County; 32.8003°N 85.1529°W	Chatahoochee River	Chatahoochee River
Riverview Dam		Harris County; 32.7928°N 85.1431°W	Chatahoochee River	Chatahoochee River
