= List of dam removals in South Carolina =

This is a list of dams in South Carolina that have been removed as physical impediments to free-flowing rivers or streams.

== Completed removals ==
Dam	Height	Year removed	Location	Watercourse	Watershed
No Name Dam at State Road 11-58	7 ft (2.1 m)	1979	Cowpens National Battlefield; 35.1194°N 81.8046°W	Long Branch of Island Creek	Broad River
Wrenn Farms Pond Dam	29 ft (8.8 m)	2022	Lancaster; 34.7674°N 80.8588°W	Tributary to Catawba River	Catawba River
Miller Trust Pond Dam	38 ft (12 m)	1993	Rock Hill; 34.975°N 81.0916°W	Tributary to Tools Fork	Catawba River
Old City Reservoir Dam	25 ft (7.6 m)	1988	Lancaster; 34.7°N 80.76°W	Turkey Quarter Creek	Catawba River
Mandel Park Pond Dam (Green Lake Estates Dam)	20 ft (6.1 m)	2017	Richland County; 33.9907°N 80.8431°W	Cedar Creek	Congaree River
Sheetpile Dam			Lexington County; 33.9375°N 81.0772°W	Conagree Creek	Congaree River
Congaree Creek Dam	15 ft (4.6 m)	2019	Cayce; 33.9375°N 81.0773°W	Conagree Creek	Congaree River
Shealy's Pond Dam	21 ft (6.4 m)		West Columbia; 33.9485°N 81.1683°W	Savana Branch	Congaree River
Kirkley Pond Dam	17 ft (5.2 m)	2001	Jefferson; 34.5374°N 80.3463°W	Little Sandy Creek	Lynches River
I-95 Rest Area Lagoon Dam	11 ft (3.4 m)	1999		Tributary to Black Creek	Pee Dee River
Matthews Creek Dam	8 ft (2.4 m)	2019	Cleveland; 35.0656°N 82.6468°W	Matthews Creek	Saluda River
Old Saluda Reservoir Dam	33 ft (10 m)		Saluda; 33.99°N 81.7716°W	Red Bank Creek	Saluda River
Robert Thomason Pond Dam (Jay's Lake Dam)	23 ft (7.0 m)		Fountain Inn; 34.6801°N 82.2072°W	Tributary to Stoddard Creek	Saluda River
Upper Northlake Dam	26 ft (7.9 m)	2022	Greenwood; 34.2318°N 82.1636°W	Tributary to Rocky Creek	Saluda River
Estimated Dam 824			Allendale County; 33.0924°N 81.5798°W	Brier Branch	Savannah River
Pole Branch Dam	26 ft (7.9 m)	1990	North Augusta; 33.5435°N 81.9919°W	Pole Branch River	Savannah River
Woodside Dam 1		2011	Greenville; 34.7746°N 82.7794°W	Twelve Mile River	Seneca River
Woodside Dam 2		2011	Greenville; 34.7661°N 82.792°W	Twelve Mile River	Seneca River
Burrell's Place Dam	15 ft (4.6 m)	2022	Oconee County; 34.9282°N 83.0991°W	Tributary to Pigpen Branch	Tugaloo River
Burson Lake Dam	30 ft (9.1 m)	2020	Oconee County; 34.8004°N 83.2876°W	Reedy Creek	Tugaloo River
Carmet Pond Dam	15 ft (4.6 m)	2020	Spartanburg County; 34.8996°N 82.1563°W	Tributary to South Tyger River	Tyger River

== See also ==
- List of dam removals in Georgia (U.S. state)
- List of dam removals in North Carolina
