= Tenmile Creek (Maryland) =

Tributary stream of Little Seneca Creek, Maryland, US

Coordinates: 39.1873282°N 77.3038732°W

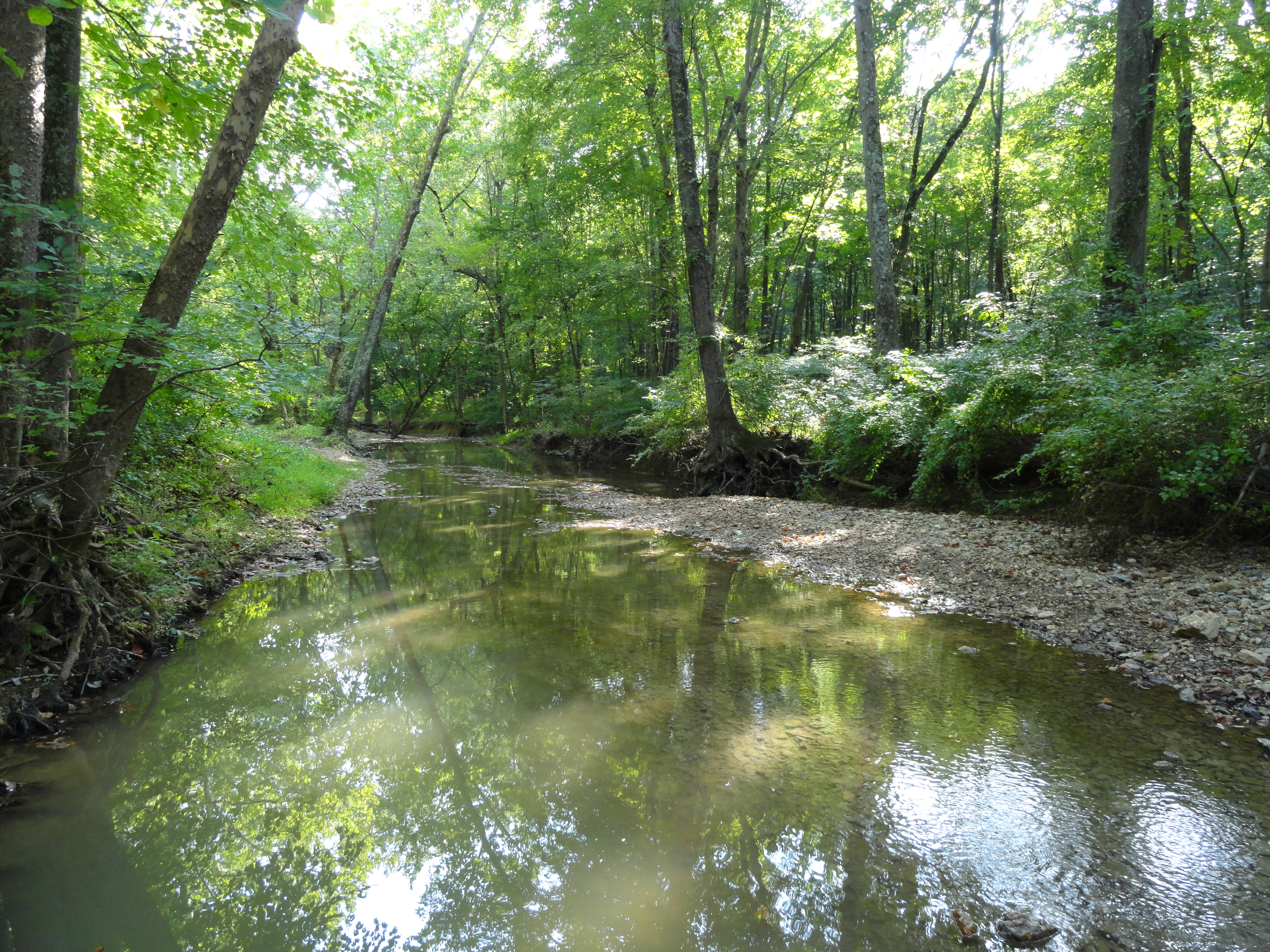
Tenmile Creek near Black Hill Regional Park

Tenmile Creek is a tributary stream of Little Seneca Creek in Montgomery County, Maryland.

== Course ==
The headwaters of the stream originate in Thompsons Corner area of the county, about 2 miles (3.2 km) northwest of Clarksburg, and the creek flows south for about 2.5 miles (4.0 km), to Little Seneca Lake, a reservoir built on Little Seneca Creek. Little Seneca Creek drains to the Potomac River and the Chesapeake Bay.

== Water quality and land use issue ==
The Tenmile Creek watershed is described as one of the highest-quality stream systems in Montgomery County, according to government studies. It is a drinking water source as part of the Little Seneca system, an emergency water supply for the metropolitan Washington, D.C. area. The creek's main stem is extensively forested and the watershed contains some agricultural land. However, the basin is bisected by an interstate highway, I-270, and in the late 1980s the county began planning for additional land development in the Clarksburg area.

In 1994 the county government had designated a portion of the watershed as a "special protection area" (SPA) to protect water quality by requiring builders to install extensive controls for stormwater runoff. A follow-up study found that after construction of several projects, water quality in the Little Seneca basin was degraded, despite the SPA requirements. In April 2014, the Montgomery County Council set additional limits on development projects in order to protect the quality of the creek and adjacent habitat. Later that year, developers filed suit against the county, claiming that the county "illegally limited construction on its property." The U.S. District Court in Maryland dismissed the suit in August 2017. The district court's dismissal was affirmed by the Fourth Circuit Court of Appeals on November 29, 2018.

== See also ==
- List of Maryland rivers
