= Cruchaga =

Cruchaga is a surname. Notable people with the surname include:

- Albert Hurtado Cruchaga or Alberto Hurtado (1901–1952), Chilean Jesuit priest, lawyer, social worker and writer of Basque origin
- Angel Cruchaga Santa María (1893–1964), Chilean writer
- Carlos González Cruchaga (1921–2008), Chilean Bishop of the Roman Catholic Church
- César Cruchaga (born 1974), retired Spanish football defender
- Juan Guzmán Cruchaga (1895–1979), Chilean poet and diplomat
- Carlos Cruchaga (born 1978), human genomicist researcher focusing neurodegenerative diseases
