= List of dam removals in Alabama =

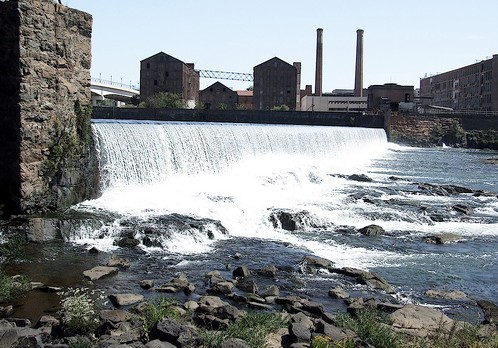
The Eagle & Phenix Dam on the Chattahoochee River prior to its demolition in 2012.

This is a list of dams in Alabama that have been removed as physical impediments to free-flowing rivers or streams.

== Removals by watershed ==
=== Black Warrior River ===
In 2007 an illegal dam was removed from Mud Creek, a tributary of the Black Warrior River. The dam had been illegally constructed by Hanceville Water and Sewer to capture raw sewage leaking from a wastewater treatment plant.

Old Shadow Lake Dam was removed from the Turkey Creek tributary in 2013. The U.S. Fish and Wildlife Service partnered with the Freshwater Land Trust to remove the dam, which had blocked passage of the endangered vermilion darter.

=== Cahaba River ===
In 2004, Marvel Slab Dam was removed from the Cahaba River. The dam consisted of 46 culverts under a bridge that allowed coal and logging trucks and coal mining equipment to cross the river.

=== Chattahoochee River ===
Two major dams have been removed from the Chattahoochee River on the Alabama–Georgia border. The Eagle & Phenix Dam was demolished in 2012 and the City Mills Dam in 2013. The removals made way for a whitewater kayaking course.

==== Proposed removals ====
In 2018, Georgia Power filed to decommission and remove two additional outdated hydroelectric dams on the Chattahoochee in Alabama–Georgia: Langdale Dam and Riverview Dam.

== Completed removals ==
| Dam | Height | Year removed | Location | Watercourse | Watershed |
|---|---|---|---|---|---|
| Unnamed dam | | 2007 | Hanceville; 34.0555°N 86.7558°W | Mud Creek | Black Warrior River |
| Old Shadow Lake Dam | 6 ft (1.8 m) | 2013 | Pinson; 33.6828°N 86.6464°W | Turkey Creek | Black Warrior River |
| Marvel Slab Dam | 6 ft (1.8 m) | 2004 | Montevallo; 33.1656°N 87.0294°W | Cahaba River | Cahaba River |
| Shades Branch Steel Ford | | 2011 | West Blocton; 33.221°N 87.0295°W | Shades Branch | Cahaba River |
| Goodwins Mill Dam | 15 ft (4.6 m) | 2013 | St. Clair County; 33.8197°N 86.3855°W | Big Canoe Creek | Coosa River |
| Unnamed dam | | 2022 | Etowah County; 34.0059°N 86.0688°W | Big Wills Creek | Coosa River |
| Eagle & Phenix Dam | 17 ft (5.2 m) | 2012 | Phenix City; 32.4698°N 84.9976°W | Chattahoochee River | Chattahoochee River |
| City Mills Dam | 10 ft (3.0 m) | 2013 | Phenix City; 32.4801°N 84.9944°W | Chattahoochee River | Chattahoochee River |
| Unnamed dam | | 2010 | Seale; 32.364°N 85.1216°W | Uchee Creek | Chattahoochee River |
| Howle and Turner Dam | 16 ft (4.9 m) | 2019 | Cleburne County; 33.552°N 85.612°W | Tallapoosa River | Tallapoosa River |
| Livingston Dam | | 2019 | Livingston; 32.5885°N 88.1975°W | Sucarnoochee River | Tombigbee River |

== Planned and proposed removals ==
| Dam | Expected year | Location | Watercourse | Watershed |
|---|---|---|---|---|
| Langdale Dam | | Chambers County; 32.8156°N 85.1653°W | Chatahoochee River | Chatahoochee River |
| Riverview Dam | | Chambers County; 32.7928°N 85.1431°W | Chatahoochee River | Chatahoochee River |
