= Little Seneca Creek =

Stream in Montgomery County, Maryland

Coordinates: 39.14344°N 77.339152°W

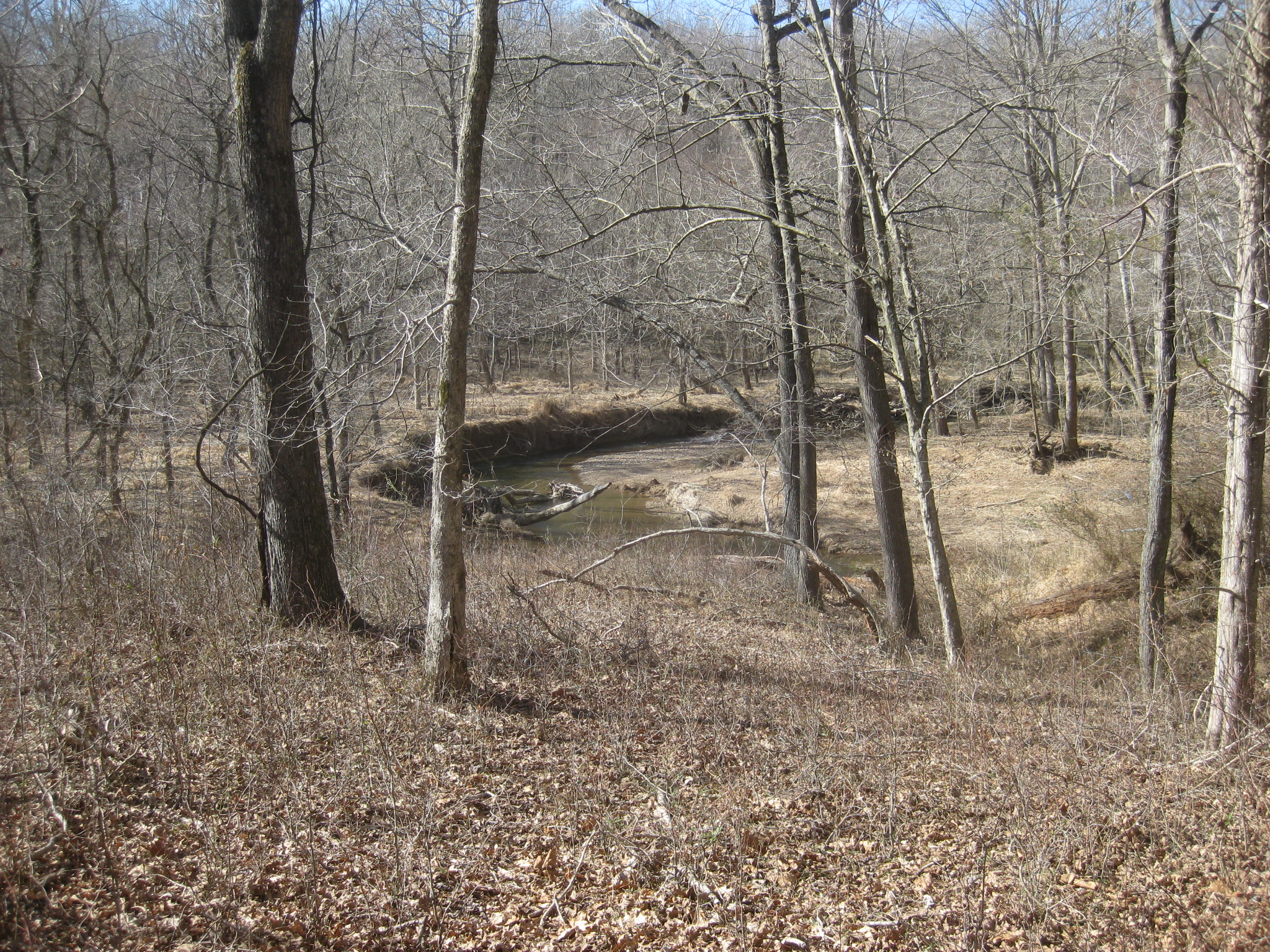
Little Seneca Creek, north of Schaeffer Road

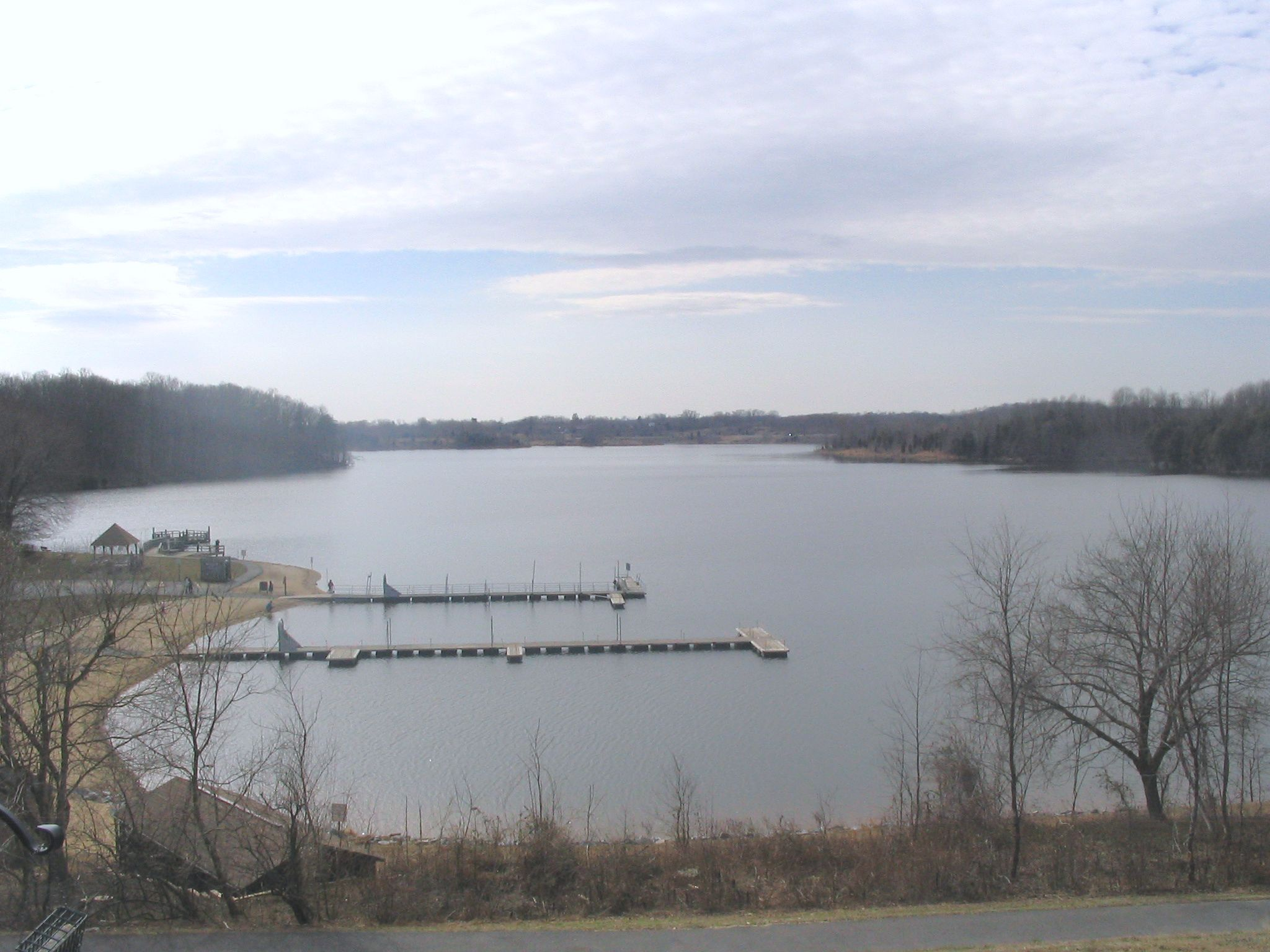
Little Seneca Lake

Little Seneca Creek is an 14.0-mile-long (22.5 km) stream in Montgomery County, Maryland, roughly 18 miles (29 km) northwest of Washington, D.C.

== Geography ==
The creek drains portions of Clarksburg, Germantown, and Boyds. It rises south of Damascus and flows southward about 4.8 miles (7.7 km) to Little Seneca Lake, a reservoir created by construction of a dam on the creek. The reservoir empties to the lower portion of the creek, which flows south about 6.6 miles (10.6 km) to Seneca Creek, which drains to the Potomac River and the Chesapeake Bay.

A portion of the creek below the lake is a cold water stream that supports wild rainbow and brown trout populations.

The creek and reservoir are a drinking water source as part of the Little Seneca system, an emergency water supply for the metropolitan Washington, D.C. area.

== Water quality issues ==
In 1994, the Montgomery County Council anticipated population growth in the Little Seneca watershed and imposed some restrictions on housing development and other new construction in part of the watershed, in order to preserve water quality before development accelerated. A "Special Protection Area" was designated that requires additional controls for stormwater runoff, beyond those required of all new projects.

However, the county reported in 2010 that its recent requirements for new construction projects had not been sufficient to prevent water quality impairment. Several large land development projects were constructed in Clarksburg and elsewhere in the watershed over the past several years. The county conducted biological monitoring of stream conditions and documented declines in water quality associated with the new construction. More comprehensive site designs to minimize stormwater runoff, such as conservation design or low impact development designs, were recommended.

In 2014, the County Council set additional limits on development projects in order to protect the quality of the Tenmile Creek tributary and adjacent habitat.

== Tributaries ==
- Boyds Tributary
- Brodsky Tributary
- Bucklodge Branch
- Cabin Branch
- Churchill Tributary
- Germantown Estates Tributary
- Milestone Tributary
- Tenmile Creek
- Town Center Tributary

== See also ==
- List of Maryland rivers
- Little Seneca Lake
- Seneca Creek
