= List of dam removals in Virginia =

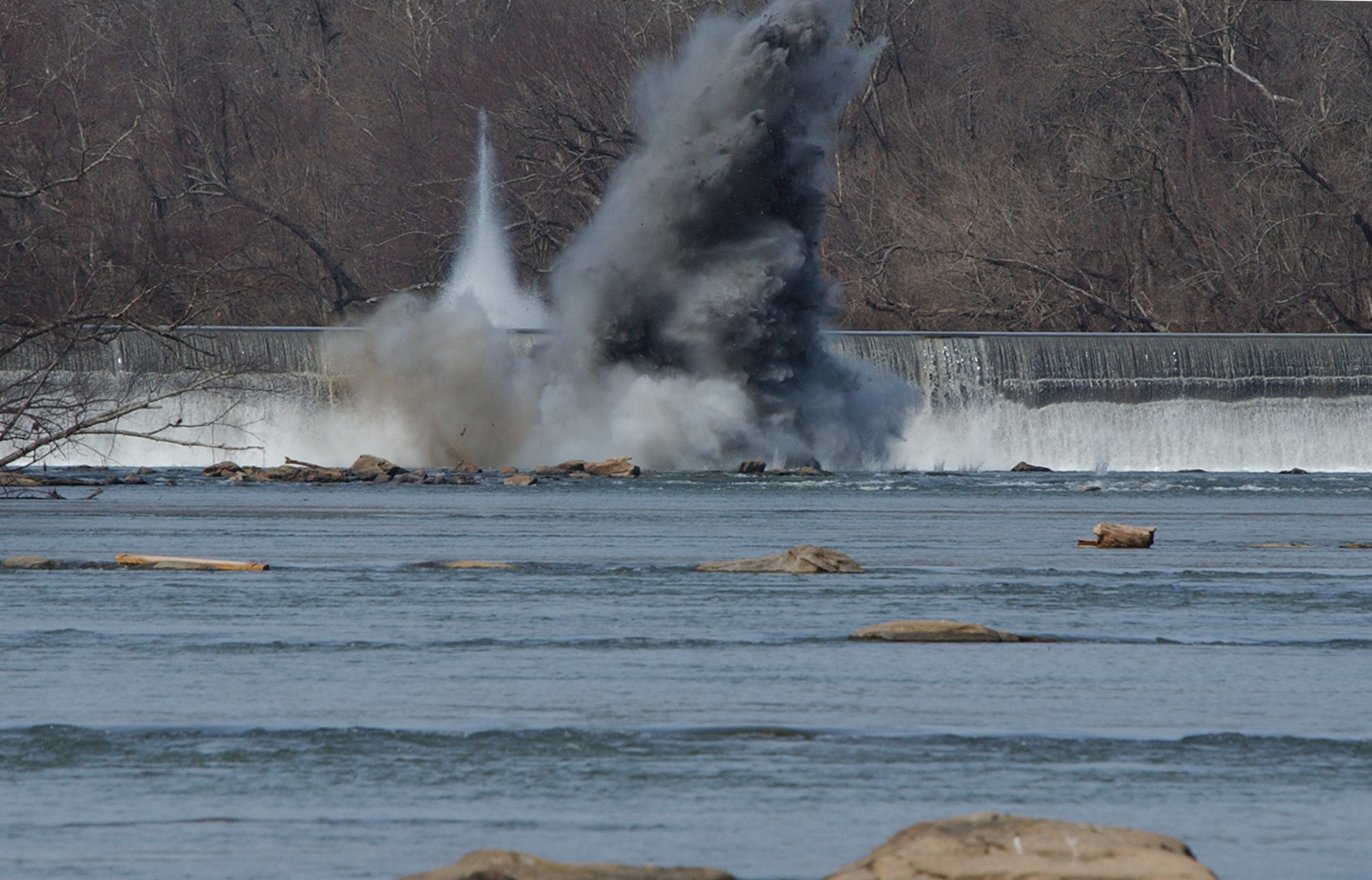
The 2004 demolition by explosives of the Embrey Dam on the Rappahannock River in Fredericksburg

This is a list of dams in Virginia that have been removed as physical impediments to free-flowing rivers or streams.

== Removals by watershed ==
=== Rappahannock River ===
Embrey Dam was a 770 ft (230 m) long hydroelectric dam on the Rappahannock River dating to 1910. It was demolished on February 23, 2004, by divers from an engineering detachment at Fort Eustis using 600 lb (270 kg) of explosives. The aim of removal was to re-open miles of spawning grounds to aid populations of American Shad, herring, catadromous American eel, and other species. The historical character of the Ambursen-type reinforced concrete structure required a parallel documentation and (partial) preservation project by industrial archeologists. In 2008 longtime U.S. Senator from Virginia John Warner described the removal of Embrey Dam as the "proudest achievement in his legislative career."

== Completed removals ==
Dam	Height	Year removed	Location	Watercourse	Watershed
Adney Gap Pond Dam	12 ft (3.7 m)	1984			
Harvell Dam	9 ft (2.7 m)	2014	Petersburg; 37.2336°N 77.4131°W	Appomattox River	Appomattox River
Soldiers Pond Dam (Sykes Dam)	22 ft (6.7 m)	2002	Fort Lee; 37.2266°N 77.355°W	Harrison Creek	Appomattox River
Dominion Virginia City Dam No. 1 (Curley Hollow Landfill; Leachate Pond Dam)	180 ft (55 m)		St. Paul; 36.9269°N 82.3433°W	Meade Creek	Clinch River
Brantley Dam	5 ft (1.5 m)	2011	Danville; 36.577°N 79.3777°W	Dan River	Dan River
Wilson Dam	12 ft (3.7 m)	2017	Henrico; 37.5289°N 77.2429°W	Tributary to Chickahominy River	James River
Griggs Dam	18 ft (5.5 m)		Henrico County; 37.4222°N 77.3091°W	Fourmile Creek	James River
Lake Charles Dam		2010	Charles City; 37.3274°N 77.2033°W	Kimages Creek	James River
Douthat North Recreational Dam		2007	Alleghany County; 37.8544°N 79.8106°W	Wilson Creek	James River
Douthat South Recreational Dam		2007	Alleghany County; 37.8527°N 79.8083°W	Wilson Creek	James River
Wilson Creek Dam	9 ft (2.7 m)	2022	Bath County; 37.944°N 79.79°W	Wilson Creek	James River
Jordan's Point Dam	10 ft (3.0 m)	2019	Rockbridge County; 37.7933°N 79.4284°W	Maury River	James River
McIver Dam	23 ft (7.0 m)	2022	Fluvanna County; 37.7263°N 78.2871°W	Bear Garden Creek	James River
Quinn Dam		2007	Amherst County and Nelson County; 37.654°N 78.9599°W	Tye River	James River
Picnic Area Dam	5 ft (1.5 m)	1984	Manassas National Battlefield Park; 38.8052°N 77.5722°W	Youngs Branch	Occoquan River
Fredricksburg & Spotsylvania Dam #6 (Ashley Farm Pond)	4 ft (1.2 m)		Fredericksburg; 38.3048°N 77.621°W	Tributary to Ninemile Run	Rappahannock River
Embrey Dam	22 ft (6.7 m)	2004	Fredericksburg; 38.3235°N 77.4921°W	Rappahannock River	Rappahannock River
Poclain Dam	2 ft (0.61 m)	1997	Fredericksburg; 38.2541°N 77.4317°W	Tributary to Rappahannock River	Rappahannock River
Fredricksburgh Milstead A Dam	5 ft (1.5 m)	2000	Fredericksburg; 38.2458°N 77.4376°W	Tributary to Rappahannock River	Rappahannock River
Fredricksburgh Milstead B Dam	15 ft (4.6 m)	2000	Fredericksburg; 38.2458°N 77.4366°W	Tributary to Rappahannock River	Rappahannock River
Fletchers Mill Dam	4 ft (1.2 m)	2010	Sperryville; 38.6581°N 78.2265°W	Thornton River	Rappahannock River
Monumental Mills Dam	10 ft (3.0 m)	2016	Culpeper County; 38.6013°N 78.0076°W	Hazel River	Rappahannock River
Spotswood Drive Dam	35 ft (11 m)	2022	Orange County; 38.3785°N 77.7805°W	Fields Run	Rapidan River
Chancellorsville Brygadier A Dam	6 ft (1.8 m)	2000	Spotsylvania Courthouse; 38.3135°N 77.68°W	Tributary to Hunting Run	Rapidan River
Chancellorsville Brygadier B Dam	6 ft (1.8 m)	2000	Spotsylvania Courthouse; 38.3164°N 77.6799°W	Tributary to Hunting Run	Rapidan River
Ashton Dam #1	25 ft (7.6 m)	2008	Spotsylvania Courthouse; 38.3136°N 77.6753°W	Tributary to Hunting Run	Rapidan River
Ashton Dam #2	4 ft (1.2 m)	2008	Spotsylvania Courthouse; 38.3147°N 77.6768°W	Tributary to Hunting Run	Rapidan River
Fredricksburg & Spotsylvania Dam #2 (Clark Farm Pond #3)	5 ft (1.5 m)		Spotsylvania Courthouse; 38.2927°N 77.7535°W	Tributary to Wilderness Run	Rapidan River
Hightop Mountain Dam		2006	Stanardsville; 38.3136°N 78.5596°W	Haneytown Creek	Rivanna River
Liberty Hall Dam		2020	Albemarle County; 38.1124°N 78.566°W	Tributary to Mechums River	Rivanna River
Moores Creek Dam	5 ft (1.5 m)	2017	Charlottesville; 38.015°N 78.519°W	Moores Creek	Rivanna River
Woolen Mills Dam		2007	Charlottesville; 38.0208°N 78.4544°W	Rivanna River	Rivanna River
River Run Dam		2020	Charlottesville; 38.056°N 78.453°W	Rivanna River	Rivanna River
Altice Mill Dam	6 ft (1.8 m)	2022	Franklin County; 37.0431°N 79.8654°W	Blackwater River	Roanoke River
New London Dam #1	28 ft (8.5 m)	2022	Bedford County; 37.2692°N 79.3322°W	Orrix Creek	Roanoke River
New London Dam #2	29 ft (8.8 m)	2022	Bedford County; 37.265°N 79.3341°W	Orrix Creek	Roanoke River
Power Dam	25 ft (7.6 m)	2016	Franklin County; 36.9955°N 79.8599°W	Pigg River	Roanoke River
Veteran's Memorial Park Dam	6 ft (1.8 m)	2012	Rocky Mount; 36.9846°N 79.8881°W	Pigg River	Roanoke River
Wasena Park Dam	5 ft (1.5 m)	2009	Roanoke; 37.2666°N 79.964°W	Roanoke River	Roanoke River
Riverton Dam	8 ft (2.4 m)	2010	Front Royal; 38.9492°N 78.1984°W	North Fork Shenandoah River	Shenandoah River
Passage Creek Dam	4.5 ft (1.4 m)	2017	Page County; 38.7058°N 78.5655°W	Passage Creek	Shenandoah River
Brews Mill Dam	6 ft (1.8 m)	2015	Augusta County; 38.1921°N 78.9374°W	Christians Creek	Shenandoah River
Knightly Dam		2004	Mt. Sidney; 38.2308°N 78.9276°W	Middle River	Shenandoah River
Mossy Creek Dam	13 ft (4.0 m)	2013	Augusta County; 38.3581°N 79.0304°W	Mossy Creek	Shenandoah River
Rockland Dam	15 ft (4.6 m)	2005	Weyers Cave; 38.3061°N 78.895°W	North River	Shenandoah River
McGaheysville Dam		2004	Harrisonburg; 38.3371°N 78.7288°W	South Fork Shenandoah River	Shenandoah River
DuPont Dam	2 ft (0.61 m)	2011	Waynesboro; 38.0594°N 78.8919°W	South River	Shenandoah River
Ramworks Dam (Rife Loth Dam)	10 ft (3.0 m)	2011	Waynesboro; 38.0598°N 78.8995°W	South River	Shenandoah River
Marion Ice Plant Dam	12 ft (3.7 m)	2015	Marion; 36.831°N 81.528°W	Middle Fork Holston River	South Fork Holston River
Fredricksburg & Spotsylvania Dam #5 (Fariview Farm Pond)	5 ft (1.5 m)		Spotsylvania Courthouse; 38.3006°N 77.6373°W	Tributary to Ni River	York River
Fredricksburgh & Spotsylvania Dam #3	5 ft (1.5 m)		Spotsylvania Courthouse; 38.2863°N 77.7395°W	Greenfield Creek	York River
Cumberland Marsh Dam		2011	New Kent; 37.5457°N 76.9866°W	Pamunkey River	York River

== See also ==
- List of dam removals in Maryland
- List of dam removals in North Carolina
- List of dam removals in Tennessee
- List of dam removals in Washington, D.C.
- List of dam removals in West Virginia
