= Joel S. Schuman =

American ophthalmologist

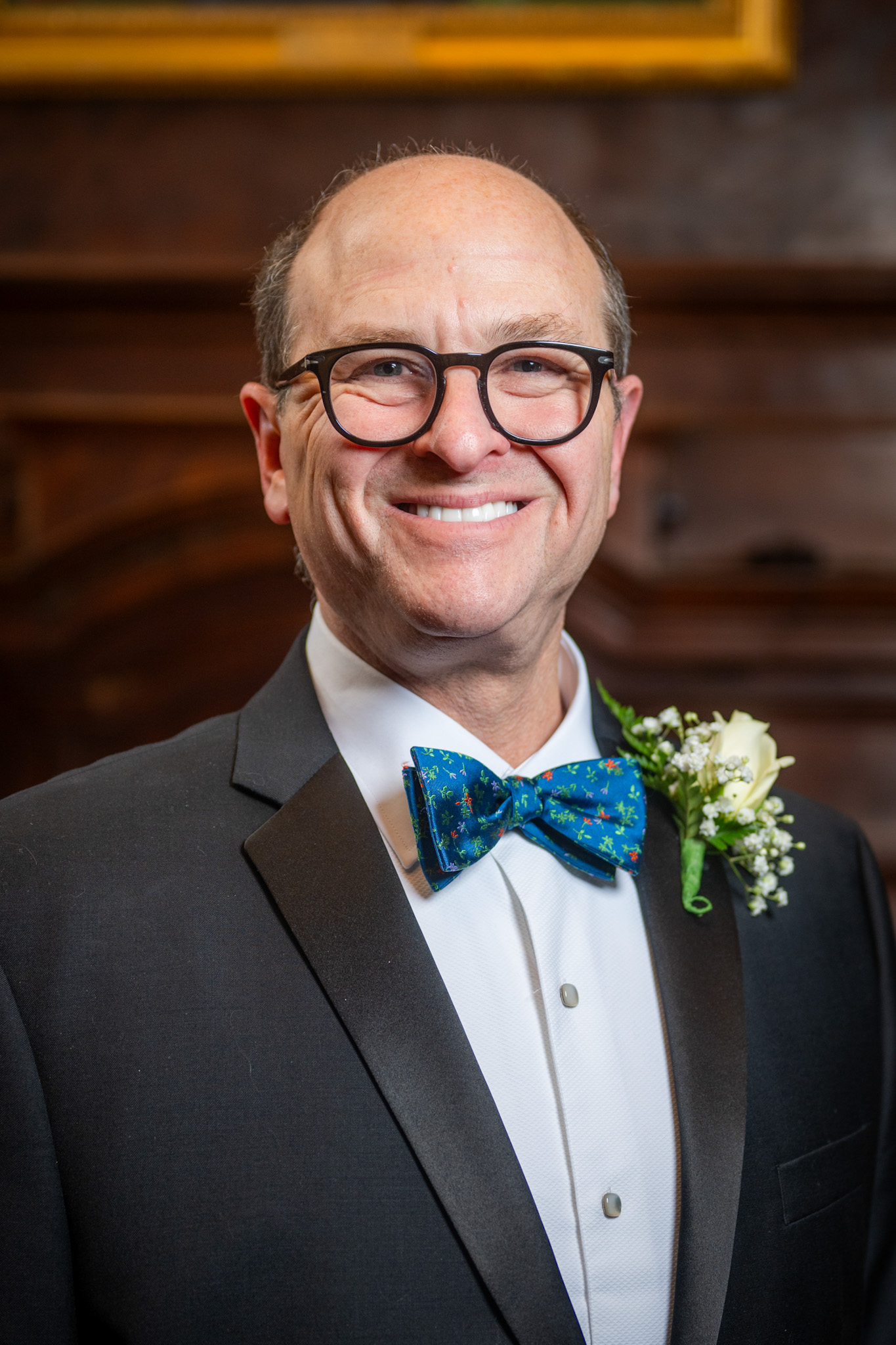

Joel S. Schuman is an American ophthalmologist and biomedical researcher best known as a co-inventor of optical coherence tomography (OCT), an imaging technology that has become a standard diagnostic tool in eye care worldwide. A graduate of Columbia University and Mount Sinai School of Medicine, he has chaired ophthalmology departments at the University of Pittsburgh and NYU Langone Health, and shared the 2012 António Champalimaud Vision Award for his role in developing OCT. He holds the Kenneth L. Roper Endowed Chair in Ophthalmology at Wills Eye Hospital in Philadelphia, where he is Vice Chair for Research Innovation and co-director of the Glaucoma Service, and is a professor of biomedical engineering at Drexel University.

== Early life and education ==
Schuman earned a Bachelor of Arts in psychology from Columbia University in 1980 and a Doctor of Medicine from Mount Sinai School of Medicine (now the Icahn School of Medicine at Mount Sinai) in 1984, and completed an ophthalmology residency at the Medical College of Virginia (now Virginia Commonwealth University) and a glaucoma fellowship at the Massachusetts Eye and Ear Infirmary, Harvard Medical School.

== Career ==
Schuman joined the Harvard Medical School faculty in the late 1980s. In 1991 he moved to Tufts University, where he was among the founding faculty of the New England Eye Center and served as residency director and chief of its glaucoma and cataract service. He went on to chair ophthalmology and direct the UPMC Eye Center at the University of Pittsburgh from 2003 to 2016, then chaired ophthalmology at NYU Langone Health/NYU Grossman School of Medicine. In 2023 he moved to Wills Eye Hospital, where he holds his present positions and holds 22 patents related to ophthalmic imaging and diagnostic technology.

== Research and the invention of optical coherence tomography ==
In the late 1980s, working at Harvard Medical School and the Massachusetts Institute of Technology, Schuman was part of an interdisciplinary team, alongside David Huang, James Fujimoto, Eric Swanson, Carmen Puliafito and Charles Lin, that developed optical coherence tomography, a noninvasive technique using low-coherence interferometry to produce cross-sectional, micrometer-resolution images of biological tissue. In a later interview, Schuman described the invention as a collaborative effort bringing together engineers and physicians, recalling "a-ha" moments when the team realized they were achieving something unprecedented. Their foundational paper, published in Science in 1991, has since been cited more than 15,000 times, and OCT is now used in an estimated 40 million diagnostic procedures annually worldwide to detect conditions such as glaucoma, macular degeneration and diabetic retinopathy. Schuman and Puliafito went on to lead some of the earliest clinical studies of OCT, involving more than 5,000 patients at the New England Eye Center. For this work, Schuman shared the 2012 António Champalimaud Vision Award, at the time the largest single prize in vision science, with his OCT co-inventors.

In 2001, Schuman and colleagues published research in Nature Medicine identifying a tissue-specific stress response in the eye's aqueous outflow pathway and the first molecular marker associated with glaucoma.

== Publications and professional service ==
Schuman has authored or co-authored more than 400 peer-reviewed scientific articles and has written or edited eight books, including Chandler and Grant's Glaucoma, along with more than 80 book chapters. He is a founding member of the Association for Research in Vision and Ophthalmology's Multidisciplinary Ophthalmic Imaging group and founded what became ARVO Imaging, originally called the International Society for Imaging in the Eye, in 2002. He has been continuously funded as a principal investigator by the National Eye Institute since 1995.

== Awards and honors ==
Schuman received a National Glaucoma Research grant from the BrightFocus Foundation in 1995 to study the genetics of glaucoma, and a second BrightFocus grant roughly 15 years later to develop OCT-based imaging of the eye's fluid drainage pathway; the foundation profiled his career in a 2019 feature. His honors include the Alcon Research Institute Award and the Lewis Rudin Glaucoma Prize from the New York Academy of Medicine, both received in 2002, the American Academy of Ophthalmology's Senior Achievement Award in 2003, and election to the American Society for Clinical Investigation in 2004. In 2013 he received the AAO's Life Achievement Honor Award and, in 2014, was named a Gold Fellow of the Association for Research in Vision and Ophthalmology. In 2019 he received the BrightFocus Foundation's Scientific Impact Award for his contributions to vision research.
