= Carlos Cruchaga =

Neuroscientist

- Education: University of Navarra (BS, PHD)
- Known for: Identification and characterization of TREM2
- Scientific career
- Fields: Neurogenomics
- Workplaces: Washington University in St. Louis; McDonnell Genome Institute
- Doctoral advisor: Juan Jose Martinez Irujo
- Website: Lab website

Carlos Cruchaga is a human genomicist with expertise in multi-omics, informatics, and neurodegeneration, with a focus on Alzheimer's disease and Parkinson's disease. He is a Professor of Psychiatry, Neurology and Genetics and Washington University School of Medicine. He is founding director of the Neurogenomics and Informatic (NGI) center at Washington University School of Medicine.

His lab uses deep molecular profiling of human samples relevant to brain and neurodegenerative diseases. He is best known for using endophenotypes and biomarkers as quantitative traits for genetics studies, which led to the identification of novel variants associated with Alzheimer's Disease risk, onset and progression.

== Education and early career ==
After receiving his undergraduate degree Biochemistry in and his graduate training in Biochemistry and Molecular Biology in 2005 at University of Navarra (Spain). Cruchaga studied the genetic basis of Alzheimer's and Parkinson disease under Pau Pastor. He then, completed his postdoctoral training in neurogenomics and system biology at the Alison Goate lab. Cruchaga started his own lab at Washington University School of Medicine in 2011.

== Research ==
Cruchaga and his lab generates and analyze human multi-omic (genetic, epigenomic, transcriptomic, proteomic, metabolomic and lipidomic) data generated from well clinically-characterized cohorts in order to identify novel genes and pathways implicated on neurodegenerative disease, mainly Alzheimer's and Parkinson's disease, to identify novel molecular biomarkers and druggable targets.

Some of Cruchaga's seminal contributions to the neurodegeneration field include the identification of MS4A4A as the major regulator of TREM2 and the identification of multiple TREM2 Alzheimer Disease risk variants. His lab also analyzed for the first time the role of Circular RNA in Alzheimer disease pathology. He and his team identified 148 circRNA that show significant and consistent association with Alzheimer Disease risk pathological traits and additional analyses suggest that circRNA could be informative biomarkers for Alzheimer disease. Cruchaga also developed a digital deconvolution algorithm to determine the cell proportions from brain RNA-seq data that lead to the identification of TMEM106B as a protective gene for neurodegeneration.

== Title and Affiliations ==
Cruchaga is the current Director of the Neurogenomics and Informatic Center, and the Hope Center DNA and RNA Purification Core. He is also the leader of the Knight-ADRC Genetics Core, the DIAN Genetics Core, the Dystonia Coalition Biobank, and co-leader of the Alzheimer's Biomarkers Consortium — Down Syndrome (ABC-DS) Genetics Core. He is also a scientific advisor of the McDonnell Genome Institute (MGI) at Washington University.

== Awards and Honors ==
Cruchaga' work has been funded by American Federation for Aging Research, National Institutes of Health, the Bright Focus Foundation, and Michael J Fox Foundation. In 2022, he was awarded the Alzheimer's Association prestigious Zenith Award.

- 2019 Named Barbara Burton and Reuben M. Morriss III Professor in Psychiatry.
- 2022 Alzheimer's Association Zenith Award

== Grants ==
Partial list

Project Title	Role in Project	Founding Source & Type
Genetic Modifiers of Cerebrospinal Fluid TREM2 in Alzheimer's Disease.	Principal Investigator	NIA-R01
Identification of Genetic Variants Associated with Rate of Disease Progression.	Principal Investigator	NIA-P01
Using Quantitative Traits to Identify Novel Genes for Alzheimers Disease and Other Complex Traits.	Principal Investigator	NIA-RF1
The Familial Alzheimer Sequencing (Fase) Project.	Principal Investigator	NIA-U01
Molecular Mechanism of the Central Regulator of TREM2 Dysfunction.	Co-Principal Investigator	Chan Zuckerberg Science Initiative (CZI) Neurodegeneration Challenge Network

== Publications ==
Semantic Scholar lists 210 publications, 20,350 citations and 627 influential citations of Cruchaga's peer-reviewed and original contribution as of 2020.

- Cruchaga C, et al. (2013. GWAS of cerebrospinal fluid tau levels identifies risk variants for Alzheimer's disease. Neuron 2013; 78(2):256-68.
- Cruchaga C et al (2014). Rare coding variants in the phospholipase D3 gene confer risk for Alzheimer's disease. Nature; 505(7484):550-4.
- Li Z, et al. (2019) The TMEM106B FTLD-protective variant, rs1990621, is also associated with increased neuronal proportion. Acta Neuropath 2019 Aug 27. doi: 10.1007/s00401-019-02066-0.
- Deming Y, et al. (2019) The MS4A gene cluster is a key regulator of soluble TREM2 and Alzheimer disease risk. Sci Transl Med. 2019 Aug 14;11(505). pii: eaau2291. doi: 10.1126/scitranslmed.aau2291.
- Dube U, et al (2019). An atlas of cortical circular RNA expression demonstrates clinical and pathological associations with Alzheimer disease. Nature Neuroscience.
