= Crow Hop Dam =

Dam on the Chattahoochee River in Georgia, United States

- Location within Georgia
- Location: Harris County, Georgia
- Coordinates: 32.8003°N 85.1529°W
- Primary inflows: Chattahoochee River
- Primary outflows: Chattahoochee River
- Basin countries: United States
- Surface elevation: 584 ft (178 m)

Crow Hop Dam is a lowhead dam on the Chattahoochee River. The dam was built to channel the river westward around the west side of Hills Island to increase generation capacity at Riverview Dam slightly downstream. It is only around 640 ft (195 m) away from Alabama's state border, which here lies along the river's western bank in Chambers County, Alabama, west of Hills Island.

Georgia Power has applied for permission to remove Crow Hop Dam in 2023.
