= Pine Knob (disambiguation) =

Pine Knob and Pineknob may refer to:

- Pine Knob, a ski area in Michigan
- Pine Knob (Pennsylvania), a peak in the Allegheny Mountains
- Pineknob, West Virginia, an unincorporated community in Raleigh County
- Pine Knob, Wisconsin, an unincorporated community in Crawford County
