= Eagle & Phenix Dam =

Eagle and Phenix Dam (1882-2012)
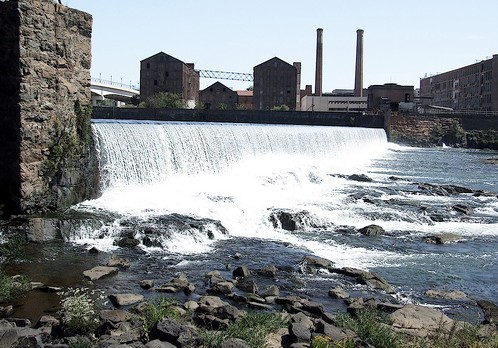
- Eagle and Phenix Dam prior to its 2012 breaching

- Location within Georgia
- Location: Columbus, Georgia / Phenix City, Alabama, US
- Coordinates: 32.4697°N 84.997°W
- Primary inflows: Chattahoochee River
- Primary outflows: Chattahoochee River
- Basin countries: United States
- Surface area: 45 acres (18 ha)
- Surface elevation: 206.7 ft (63.0 m)

The Eagle and Phenix Dam was a stone dam on the Chattahoochee River, in downtown Columbus, Georgia. The dam was built in 1882 to power the Eagle and Phenix Textile Mill. It was located just south of the 13th Street Bridge connecting Columbus to Phenix City, Alabama. The dam produced a 45-acre (18 ha) run of the river reservoir that extended approximately 1 mile (1.6 km) upstream.

The Eagle and Phenix Dam site is now owned by the City of Columbus. The dam was breached during March 2012 in order to restore natural flowing conditions. This was to create an urban whitewater park along the river.

== See also ==
- City Mills Dam
- List of dam removals in Alabama
- List of dam removals in Georgia (U.S. state)
