= City Mills Dam =

City Mills Dam (1907–2013)
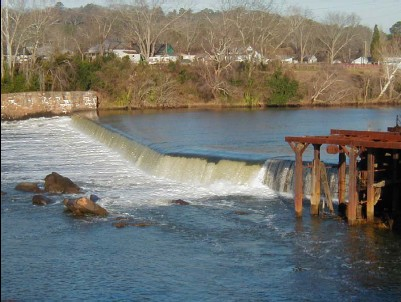
- City Mills Dam
- Interactive map of City Mills Dam (1907–2013)
- Location: Columbus, Georgia / Phenix City, Alabama, United States
- Coordinates: 32.480°N 84.994°W
- Opening date: 1907
- Demolition date: 2013

Dam and spillways
- Impounds: Chattahoochee River
- Elevation at crest: 252 ft (77 m)

Reservoir
- Surface area: 110 acres (45 ha)

City Mills Dam was a dam on the Chattahoochee River, between Downtown Columbus, Georgia, and Phenix City, Alabama. The dam was built in 1907 to power the City Mills grist mill. Previously, a wooden dam dating to 1828 had existed at the site. The dam impounded a 1.3-mile (2.1 km) run of the river reservoir of approximately 110 acres (0.45 km^{2}).

The City of Columbus, Georgia, breached the dam on March 12, 2013, to create an urban whitewater area on the river.

== See also ==
- Eagle & Phenix Dam
- List of dam removals in Alabama
- List of dam removals in Georgia (U.S. state)
