= Pineknob, West Virginia =

Pineknob
- Unincorporated community
- Location within the state of West Virginia Pineknob (the United States)
- Coordinates: 37°50′35″N 81°28′53″W
- Country: United States
- State: West Virginia
- County: Raleigh
- Elevation: 1,355 ft (413 m)
- Time zone: UTC-5 (Eastern (EST))
  - Summer (DST): UTC-4 (EDT)
- GNIS ID: 1544911

Pineknob is an unincorporated community in Raleigh County, West Virginia, United States.
