= BrightFocus Foundation =

Nonprofit organization in the U.S.

- Founded: May 15, 1973; 53 years ago
- Founders: Janette Michaels, Eugene Michaels
- Type: Foundation
- Purpose: Alzheimer's disease, macular degeneration, glaucoma, medical research
- Location: Clarksburg, Maryland, U.S.
- Coordinates: 39.227134°N 77.278680°W
- President, Chief Executive Officer: Stacy Pagos Haller
- Subsidiaries: National Development LLC, American Health Assistance LLC
- Employees: 58 (2019)
- Volunteers: 51 (2019)
- Website: www.brightfocus.org
- Formerly called: The American Health Assistance Foundation

BrightFocus Foundation is a nonprofit organization based in Clarksburg, Maryland. BrightFocus funds research in an effort to discover cures for Alzheimer's disease, macular degeneration and glaucoma, and provides information and free English and Spanish resources to increase awareness about these diseases. Through its research programs — Alzheimer’s Disease Research, National Glaucoma Research, and Macular Degeneration Research — the Foundation has awarded over $300 million in research funding. BrightFocus provides free public education and free printed brochures and publications on brain and eye diseases in English and Spanish, including Alzheimer's disease, macular degeneration, and glaucoma. BrightFocus has active research grants in 17 countries and at 154 institutions. BrightFocus Foundation offers free monthly low-vision audio podcast programs with medical experts on Glaucoma and Macular Degeneration and a free expert Alzheimer's video series called "Zoom in On Alzheimer's and Dementia" with medical doctors.

== History ==
BrightFocus was founded on May 15, 1973, as The American Health Assistance Foundation (AHAF) by husband and wife team, Janette Michaels and Eugene Michaels as Executive Director and President, respectively, and funded research that led to the development of the first artificial heart.

In 2012, BrightFocus Foundation partnered with three other nonprofit organizations as the 21st Century Brain Trust, which was the runner-up in the Collaborate Activate Innovation Challenge, a competition sponsored by Sanofi US, for the Trust's work in developing mobile applications that detect early symptoms of Alzheimer's disease. Effective 1 February 2013 AHAF changed its name to BrightFocus Foundation. The charity selected the new name to better communicate its goals, "to save mind and sight," according to BrightFocus President and CEO Stacy Pagos Haller.

BrightFocus Foundation funded two researchers who went on to win Nobel prizes, Paul Greengard and Stanley B. Prusiner. BrightFocus funded Joel S. Schuman, who found the first biomarker for glaucoma and improved OCT.

BrightFocus Foundation provided early funding that led to the first-ever Alzheimer's disease blood test development.

== Research programs ==
BrightFocus Foundation awards grants, fellowships, and produces educational materials and programs through its three research programs, currently funding 287 research projects worldwide:

- Alzheimer's Disease Research Program, currently funding 167 research projects. The program started in 1985 and has funded research for $170 million. In 2022, the program has funded 55 new research projects for nearly $14 million.
- Macular Degeneration Research Program, currently funding 58 research projects. The program started in 1999 and has funded research for $46 million. In 2022, the program has funded 21 new research projects for nearly $7 million.
- National Glaucoma Research Program, currently funding 62 research projects. The program started in 1978 and has funded research for $47 million. In 2022, the program has funded 19 new research projects for nearly $4 million.

== Awards and recognition ==
In 2013, BrightFocus Foundation earned a Seal of Excellence from the Maryland Association of Nonprofit Organizations, which requires organizations to go through a rigorous application process to certify that they are well-run and worthy of public trust.

== Charity assessment ==
BrightFocus Foundation has a 4-star rating on Charity Navigator, with an overall score of 96/100 for financial, accountability, impact, community, and leadership. BrightFocus Foundation received a 2022 GuideStar Platinum Transparency certification.
