= Cumberland Dam =

Dam on the Potomac River in Cumberland, Maryland

Coordinates: 39°38′54.5″N 78°45′56.5″W

- Interactive map of Cumberland Dam
- Country: United States
- Location: Cumberland, Maryland

The Cumberland Dam was a dam that was built across North Branch of the Potomac River in Cumberland, Maryland, for the purpose of diverting water from the river into the head of the Chesapeake and Ohio Canal. The Chesapeake and Ohio Canal Company began construction of Dam No. 8 in 1837 and work proceeded intermittently, finally concluding in 1850. The dam impounded water over a distance of a mile, causing back water for about 3 miles (4.8 km) up the river. Above the dam is the mouth of Wills Creek.

== Environmental impact ==
In the early 1900s, Potomac River received a large quantity of industrial sewage and refuse from a paper mill, a brewery, a distillery, a cement works, a tannery, a gas plant, and a number of coal mines. Furthermore, in the early 1900s the city of Cumberland supplied 2,500,000 US gallons (9,500 m^{3}) of water and discharged 1,000,000 US gallons (3,800 m^{3}) per day into Wills Creek. Wills creek enters the Potomac below the dam. Over the years the river has become much cleaner. Wild trout now live in the river and they are prevented from traveling up stream by the structure. These fish die that end up being stuck below the dam when water temperatures rise above 70 degrees. The removal of the dam will further improve the overall quality of the river and also allow fish to travel to colder water upstream and survive. Mussels are carried upstream by fish and need those migratory fish to spread. Mussels also clean water and filter pollution.

About 400 yards (370 m) above the dam was the intake of the Cumberland waterworks, where the city's water was pumped from the river directly into the water mains and was served to the inhabitants without being purified through filter beds or other artificial means. Complaints arose yearly prior to 1900 during the dry season, when the water, besides being unpalatable, was scarcely clean enough for laundering purposes. Of the large percentage of impurities which the water contained at such times, a portion was composed of sewage from the city that had backed up to the point of intake of the dam.

Much has changed since 1900 to eliminate these problems. The city's economy has made a significant transition away from manufacturing and coal production. The city's water is filtered and obtained from other water supplies. The city’s sewage is now treated before being discharged.
