= Buckhorn Creek =

Stream in Ohio, US

Coordinates: 40°16′28″N 81°37′36″W

Buckhorn Creek is a stream in the U.S. state of Ohio.

Buckhorn Creek was so named on account of its irregular shape.

== See also ==
- List of rivers of Ohio
