= Clarksburg, Maryland =

- Census-designated place
- Flag

- Location of Clarksburg, Maryland
- Coordinates: 39°14′30″N 77°15′05″W
- Country: United States
- State: Maryland
- County: Montgomery
- Founded: 1752

Area
  - Total: 9.96 sq mi (25.79 km^{2})
  - Land: 9.65 sq mi (24.99 km^{2})
  - Water: 0.31 sq mi (0.80 km^{2})
- Elevation: 551 ft (168 m)

Population (2020)
  - Total: 29,051
  - Density: 3,010.9/sq mi (1,162.51/km^{2})
- Time zone: UTC−5 (Eastern (EST))
  - Summer (DST): UTC−4 (EDT)
- ZIP code: 20871
- Area codes: 301, 240
- FIPS code: 24-17350
- GNIS feature ID: 2389325

Clarksburg is a census-designated place and an unincorporated area in northern Montgomery County, Maryland, United States. It is located at the northern end of the Interstate 270 technology corridor, approximately four miles north of Germantown. As of the 2020 census, Clarksburg had a population of 29,051.

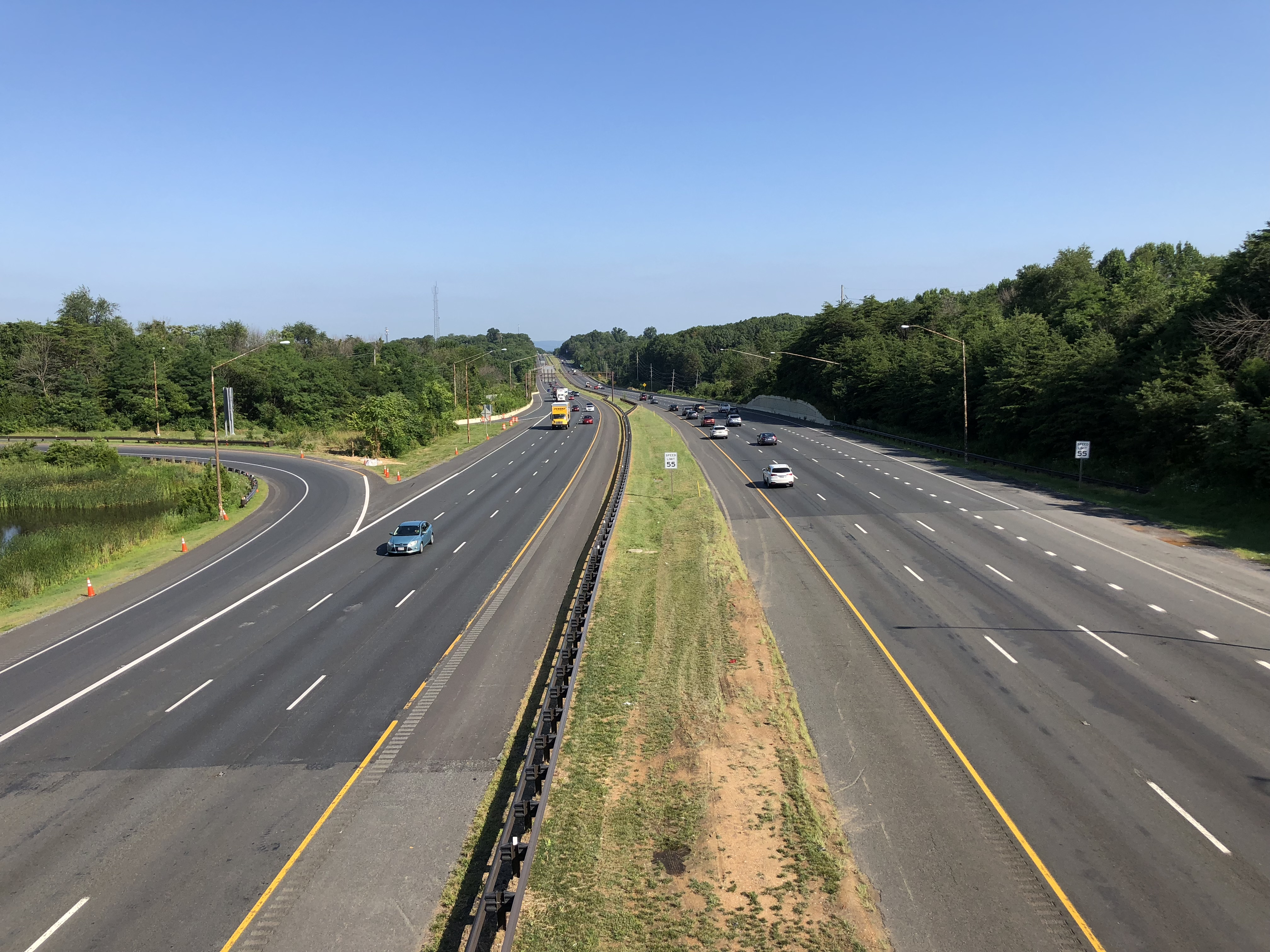
View north along I-270 from the overpass for Maryland State Route 121 (Clarksburg Road)

== History ==
Clarksburg is named for trader John Clarke, and was established at the intersection of the main road between Georgetown and Frederick and an old Seneca trail. One of its earliest white inhabitants was a man named Michael Ashford Dowden, who in 1752 received a patent for 40 acres (160,000 m^{2}) from the colonial government called "Hammer Hill", and two years later permission to build an inn. The inn itself is a footnote in history, hosting the army of General Edward Braddock during the French and Indian War, serving as a meeting place for local Sons of Liberty in the years before the American Revolution, and possibly serving dinner to President Andrew Jackson on his way to his inauguration. Jamie, grandson of the trader, built a general store in the area around 1770, and over the next thirty years enough people moved to the area that Clark was appointed postmaster for the community. By 1875, Clarksburg was a major town in the northern part of the county, but the construction of the Baltimore and Ohio Railroad undermined its economy.

In 1964, the Montgomery County planning commission decided that Clarksburg would be the last community along Interstate 270 that would have large-scale development. The Montgomery County Council adopted a master plan for Clarksburg in 1968, which rezoned land for a mix of townhouses and single-family houses. Another master plan was adopted in 1994. This master plan set forth the areas to be developed, with targets for housing, retail, employment and transit. A network of roads and infrastructure was mapped out to handle the growth expected as the town grew to 40,000 residents. The center of this plan is the Town Center District, which contains a retail area connected to the historic town business district. It was planned to be built early on, but had not broken ground by 2010, to the dismay of some residents. A Harris Teeter-anchored shopping center opened in 2013, and a large mall called Clarksburg Premium Outlets opened in October 2016. The shopping complex has over 90 stores and provides jobs for the region.

In June 2015, the Clarksburg Chamber of Commerce held a contest and chose a flag designed by Shaneea Peek. The inspiration of the flag was derived from Dowden's Ordinary which is a historic landmark of the community of Clarksburg.

=== Development ===
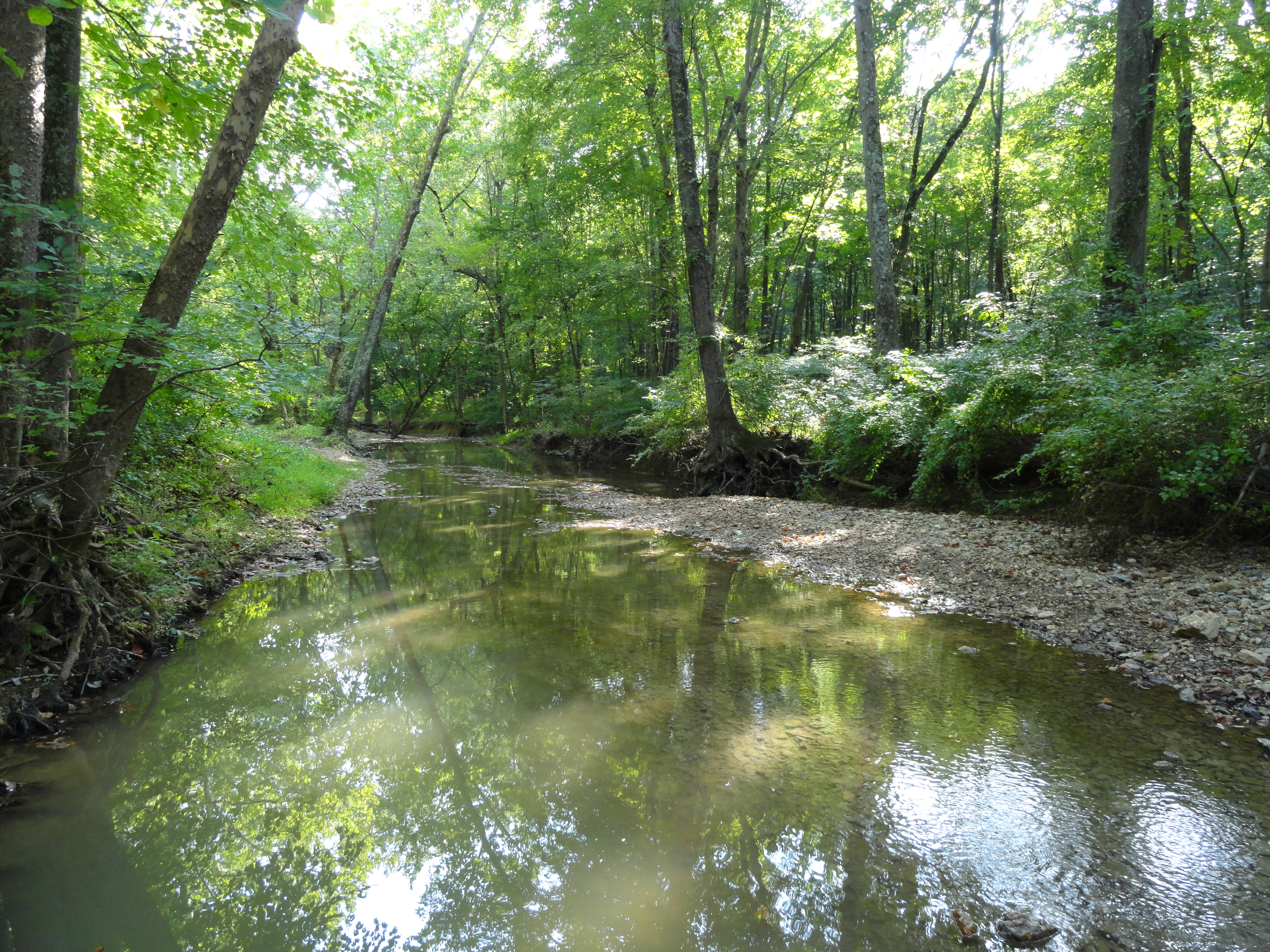
Ten Mile Creek, Clarksburg

Since 2000, there has been major growth in the area of Clarksburg. A new town center is being built in the heart of Clarksburg, near the historic center. 2010 Census data showed that over 13,677 residents and 4,352 households resided in Clarksburg, which consisted of a diverse population with a high level of education attainment. Several public parks and schools have been built to help accommodate the growth.

==== Zoning violations ====
During the boom growth period it was discovered that some of the new houses were built closer together than the minimum distance required by zoning laws, with roads built too narrow for fire trucks to pass, and homes and community facilities built without adequate permits or approvals by the county government. This was found to be the fault of inadequate county oversight and lax enforcement of building codes and laws combined with a building boom in the early 2000s.

==== Environmental impacts ====
In April 2014, the Montgomery County Council set additional limits on development projects in order to protect the quality of nearby Tenmile Creek, a drinking water source and emergency water supply for the metropolitan Washington, D.C. area. Later that year, developers filed suit against the county, claiming that the county "illegally limited construction on its property." The U.S. District Court in Maryland dismissed the suit in August 2017. The district court's dismissal was affirmed by the Fourth Circuit Court of Appeals on November 29, 2018.

== Geography ==
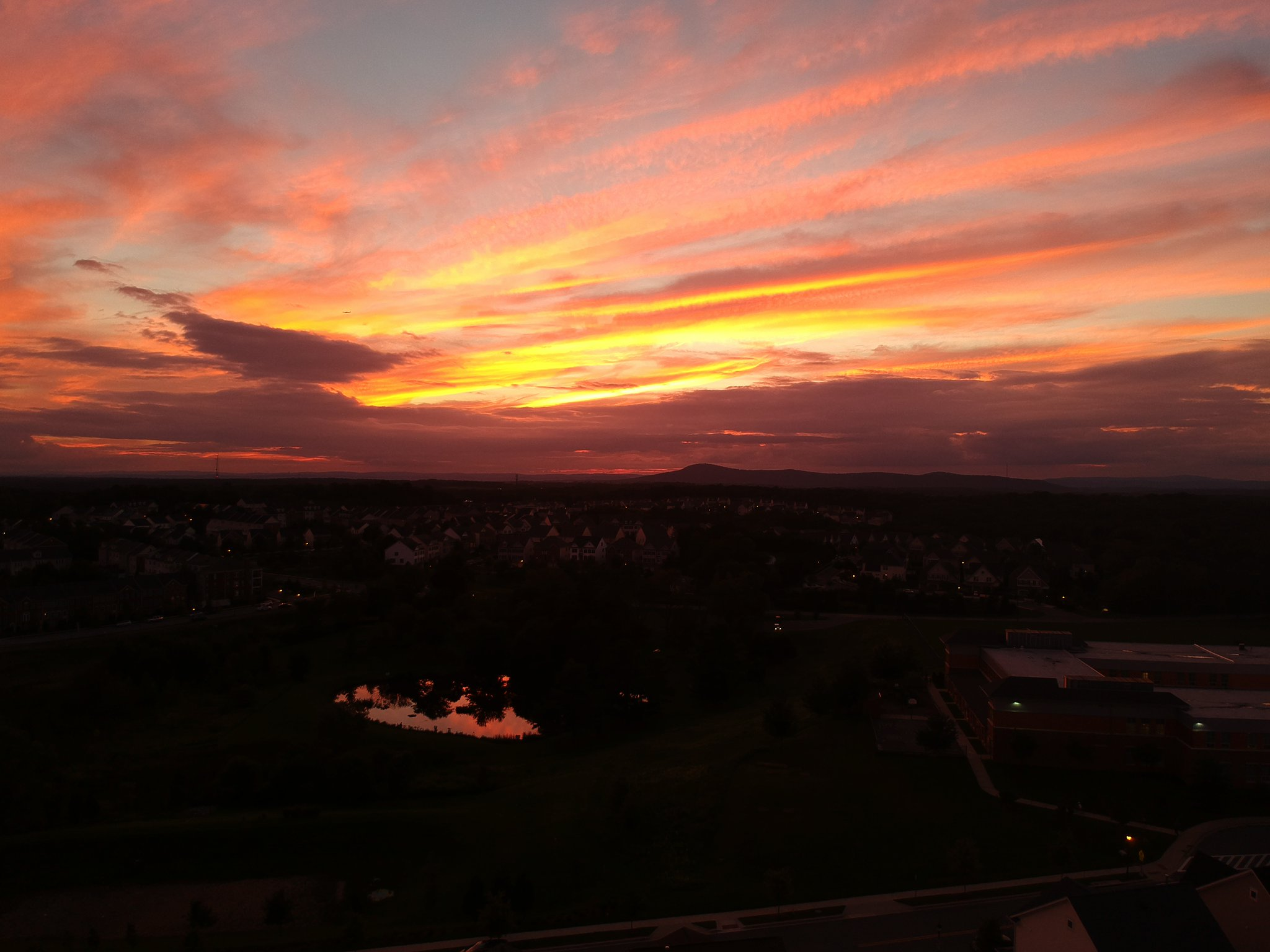
Clarksburg at dusk

As an unincorporated area, Clarksburg's boundaries are not officially defined. Clarksburg is, however, recognized by the United States Census Bureau as a census-designated place, and by the United States Geological Survey as a populated place.

According to the United States Census Bureau, it has a total area of 8.3 square miles (21 km^{2}), of which 8.2 square miles (21 km^{2}) is land and 0.1 square miles (0.26 km^{2}) (1.82%) is water.

Roads in Clarksburg include MD 355, I-270, and MD 121.

== Demographics ==
Historical population
Census	Pop.	Note	%±
2000	1,834		—
2010	13,766		650.6%
2020	29,051		111.0%
2010–2020

=== Racial and ethnic composition ===
Clarksburg CDP, Maryland – Racial and ethnic composition Note: the US Census treats Hispanic/Latino as an ethnic category. This table excludes Latinos from the racial categories and assigns them to a separate category. Hispanics/Latinos may be of any race.
Race / Ethnicity (NH = Non-Hispanic)	Pop 2000	Pop 2010	Pop 2020	% 2000	% 2010	% 2020
White alone (NH)	1,619	5,309	7,342	88.28%	38.57%	25.27%
Black or African American alone (NH)	65	1,996	5,521	3.54%	14.50%	19.00%
Native American or Alaska Native alone (NH)	0	11	17	0.00%	0.08%	0.06%
Asian alone (NH)	81	4,612	11,282	4.42%	33.50%	38.84%
Native Hawaiian or Pacific Islander alone (NH)	0	10	7	0.00%	0.07%	0.02%
Other race alone (NH)	3	28	195	0.16%	0.20%	0.67%
Mixed race or Multiracial (NH)	16	452	1,302	0.87%	3.28%	4.48%
Hispanic or Latino (any race)	50	1,348	3,385	2.73%	9.79%	11.65%
Total	1,834	13,766	29,051	100.00%	100.00%	100.00%

=== 2020 census ===
As of the 2020 census, Clarksburg had a population of 29,051. The median age was 36.5 years. 31.1% of residents were under the age of 18 and 8.1% of residents were 65 years of age or older. For every 100 females there were 93.6 males, and for every 100 females age 18 and over there were 88.3 males age 18 and over.

98.5% of residents lived in urban areas, while 1.5% lived in rural areas.

There were 8,764 households in Clarksburg, of which 56.3% had children under the age of 18 living in them. Of all households, 69.7% were married-couple households, 9.1% were households with a male householder and no spouse or partner present, and 18.0% were households with a female householder and no spouse or partner present. About 11.4% of all households were made up of individuals and 3.1% had someone living alone who was 65 years of age or older.

There were 8,972 housing units, of which 2.3% were vacant. The homeowner vacancy rate was 0.8% and the rental vacancy rate was 2.7%.

Racial composition as of the 2020 census
Race	Number	Percent
White	7,917	27.3%
Black or African American	5,603	19.3%
American Indian and Alaska Native	78	0.3%
Asian	11,326	39.0%
Native Hawaiian and Other Pacific Islander	8	0.0%
Some other race	1,281	4.4%
Two or more races	2,838	9.8%

=== 2010 census ===
As of the 2010 census, there were 13,766 people and 4,352 households residing in the area. The population density was 1,667.9 inhabitants per square mile (644.0/km^{2}). The population is roughly 44.1% White, 14.7% African-American, 0.1% American Indian or Alaska Native, 33.6% Asian, 0.1% Native Hawaiian or Pacific Islander, including 9.8% of the population Hispanic or Latino origin of any race.

=== 2000 census ===
In 2000 there were 604 households, out of which 42.1% had children under the age of 18 living with them, 72.0% were married couples living together, 6.6% had a female householder with no husband present, and 17.5% were non-families. 13.9% of all households were made up of individuals, and 4.6% had someone living alone who was 65 years of age or older. The average household size was 3.04 and the average family size was 3.34.

In the area, the population was spread out, with 29.3% under the age of 18, 4.8% from 18 to 24, 29.7% from 25 to 44, 27.4% from 45 to 64, and 8.8% who were 65 years of age or older. The median age was 38 years. For every 100 females, there were 100.2 males. For every 100 females age 18 and over, there were 103.6 males.

The median income for a household in the CDP was $88,419, and the median income for a family was $91,216. Males had a median income of $63,125 versus $42,283 for females. The per capita income for the area was $33,174. About 3.4% of families and 4.6% of the population were below the poverty line, including 6.3% of those under age 18 and 6.8% of those age 65 or over.

== Education ==
School name	Capacity	Actual Student Enrollment 2017–2018 school year	Projected Student Enrollment 2018–2019 school year	Percent Change	Percent of Capacity 2011–2012 school year
Clarksburg Elementary School	589	312	410	+76.09%	69.60%
Wilson Wims Elementary	1,399	752	1,220	+61.63%	53.75%
Little Bennett Elementary School	685	624	614	-1.61%	91.09%
Hallie Wells	982	752	788	+4.79%	76.58%
Rocky Hill Middle School	956	1,020	809	-20.69%	106.69%
Clarksburg High School	1,629	2,034	2,334	+14.74%	124.86%

The two newest schools, Little Bennett Elementary School and Clarksburg High School, have the largest increase of students, with Little Bennett at 71.4% above building capacity in the projections of 2011–2012. This has led to a moratorium in issuance of permits for new projects, but not issuance of permits in existing projects, for new homes in the Clarksburg area. The majority of planned housing units will be built in existing projects. All four of the largest neighborhoods are exempt from the moratorium.

== Parks and recreation ==
Clarksburg has many local hiking trails, small playgrounds, and sport fields. There are local campgrounds and community pools. Parks in Clarksburg include Ovid Hazen Wells Recreational Park, Arora Hills Park, and Piedmont Woods Local Park. Larger parks in the area include Little Bennet Regional Park, and Black Hills Park, which is primarily located in Boyds. Multiple farms, private and public, serve production and tourism purposes.

== Businesses and organizations ==
BrightFocus Foundation and Thales Communications are headquartered in Clarksburg. Local organizations include the Clarksburg Chamber of Commerce and Clarksburg Historical Society.
