= Langdale Dam =

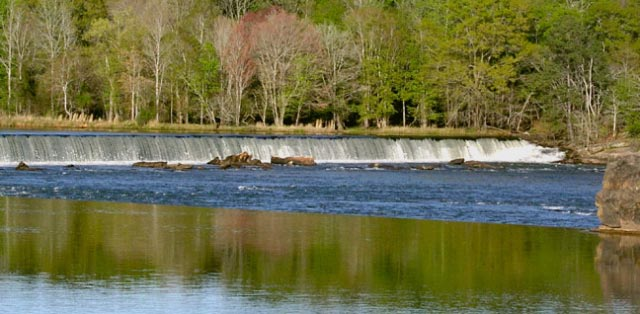
- Langdale Dam

- Location within Georgia
- Location: Harris County, Georgia / Chambers County, Alabama
- Coordinates: 32.8156°N 85.1653°W
- Primary inflows: Chattahoochee River
- Primary outflows: Chattahoochee River
- Basin countries: United States
- Surface elevation: 584 ft (178 m)

Langdale Dam is a lowhead dam on the Chattahoochee River just south of Langdale, Alabama.

The dam was built in 1908 to provide electricity for the former Langdale Mills, and is now owned and operated by Georgia Power. It produces an average of 1 megawatt of hydroelectric power.

The river here lies entirely on the Georgia side of the state line, but the dam itself does enter into Alabama territory.

Georgia Power has applied for permission to remove Langdale Dam in 2023.
