= Little Seneca Lake =

Lake in Montgomery County, Maryland

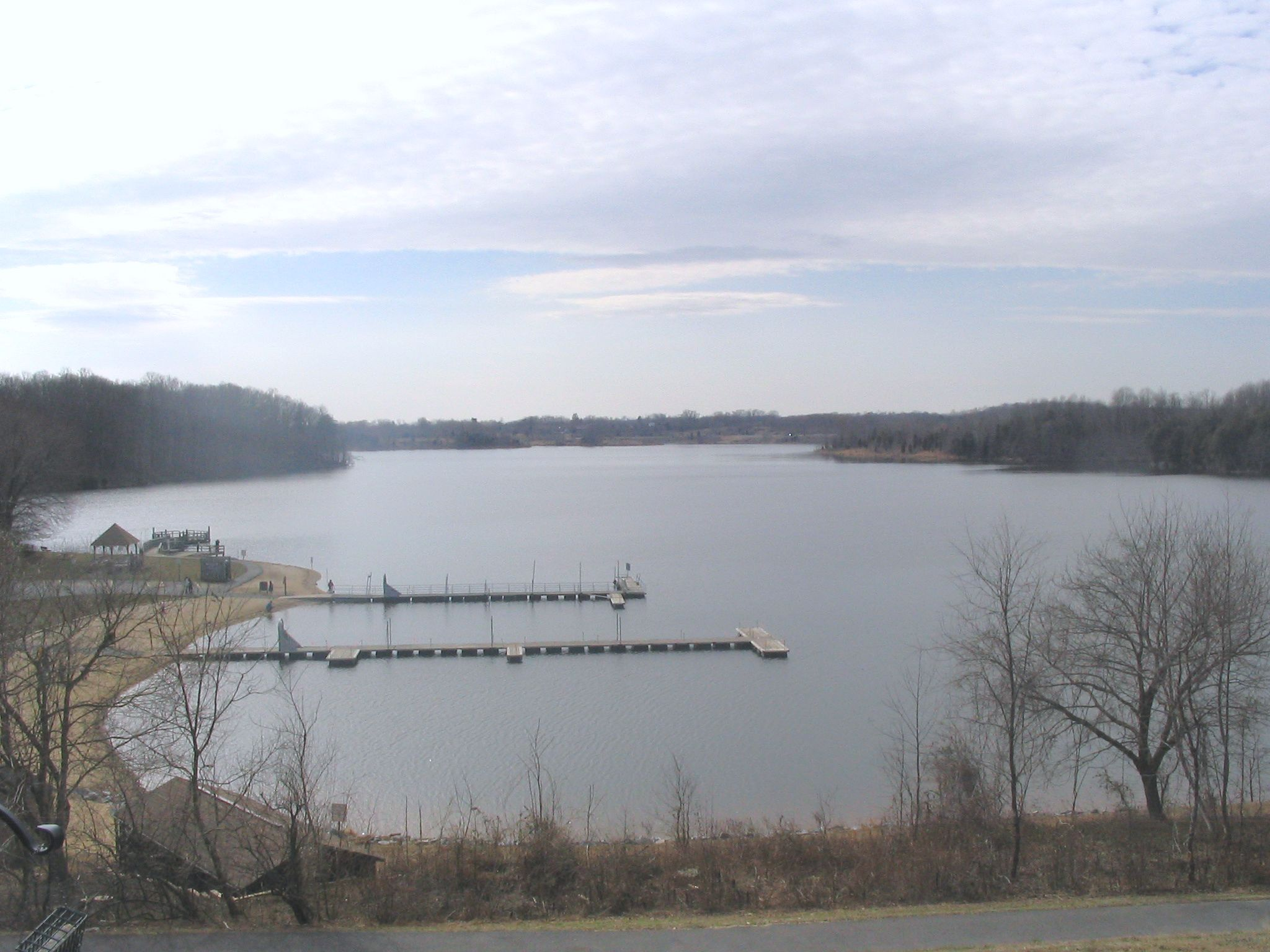
- March 2008

- Location within Maryland Location within the United States
- Location: Boyds, Maryland
- Coordinates: 39.18799°N 77.306671°W
- Type: Reservoir
- Primary inflows: Little Seneca Creek
- Primary outflows: Little Seneca Creek
- Catchment area: 21 square miles (54 km^{2})
- Basin countries: United States
- Surface area: 505 acres (204 ha)
- Average depth: 24.7 ft (7.5 m)
- Max. depth: 68 ft (21 m)
- Water volume: 4.5 billion US gallons (17,000,000 m^{3})
- Surface elevation: 384 feet (117 m)

Little Seneca Lake is a reservoir located near the Boyds community in Montgomery County, Maryland.

== Overview ==
The surface area of the lake is 505 acres (2.04 km^{2}). The average depth is 24.7 feet (7.5 m) with a maximum depth of 68 feet (21 m). The capacity of the lake is 4.5 billion gallons (17 million m^{3}).

The lake was created by the construction of a dam on Little Seneca Creek. It was built to provide an emergency water supply for the metropolitan Washington, D.C. area, and it also provides a recreational amenity for the public.

== Drinking water supply ==
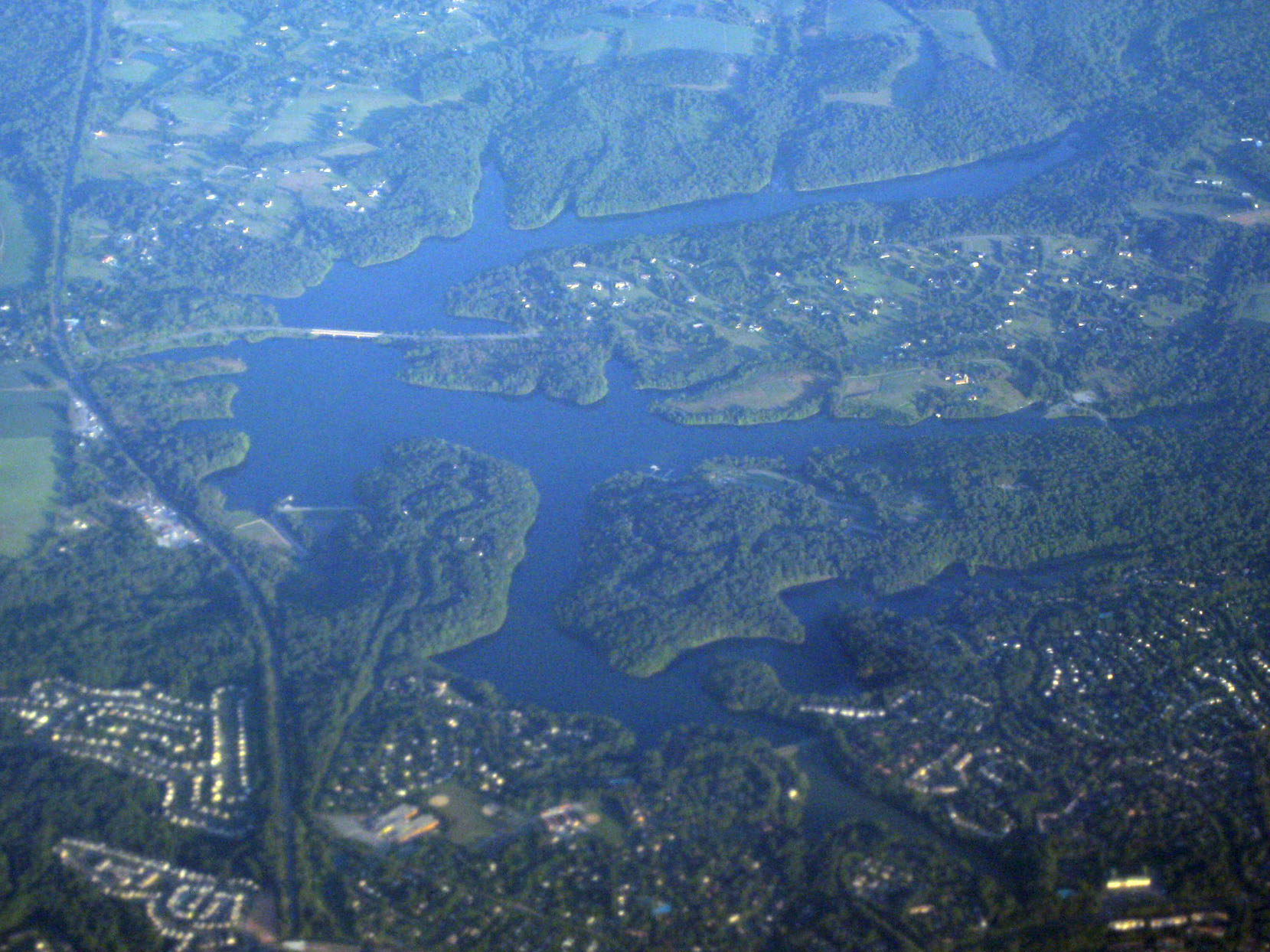
Oblique air photo of Little Seneca Lake, facing west on 1 August 2011.

The lake was completed in 1984 and the water supply dam is operated by the Washington Suburban Sanitary Commission (WSSC). WSSC shares the drinking water resource with two adjacent public water suppliers, the Washington Aqueduct and the Fairfax County Water Authority.

== Recreational facilities ==
The lake is located in Black Hill Regional Park. Fishing and boating facilities are available at the park. The lake is stocked for recreational fishing. Fish species found in the lake include largemouth bass, tiger muskie, channel catfish, sunfish, perch and crappie.

== See also ==
- Seneca Creek
