= List of dam removals in Maryland =

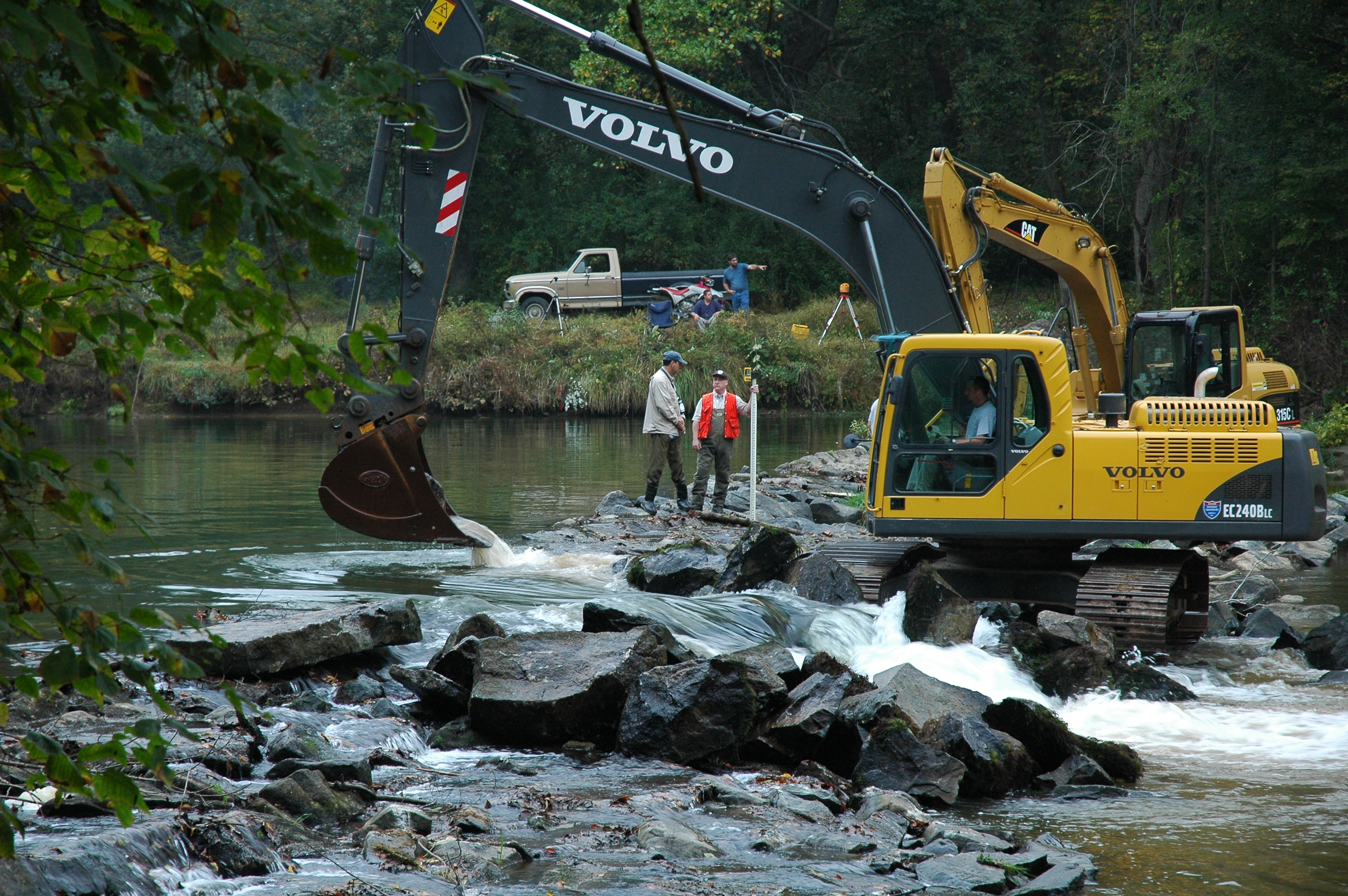
The 2004 removal of the Octoraro Dam from Octoraro Creek.

This is a list of dams in Maryland that have been removed as physical impediments to free-flowing rivers or streams.

== Completed removals ==
Dam	Height	Year removed	Location	Watercourse	Watershed
Centreville Dam	5 ft (1.5 m)	2015	Centreville; 39.048°N 76.062°W	Gravel Run	Corsica River
White Hall Dam		2011	White Hall; 39.6206°N 76.6297°W	Little Falls	Gunpowder River
Martin Farm Pond Dam (Overshot Branch Dam)	25 ft (7.6 m)	2019	Harford County; 39.5239°N 76.4441°W	Overshot Branch	Gunpowder River
Clifford Branch Dam	6 ft (1.8 m)	2012	Frederick; 39.4874°N 77.4712°W	Clifford Branch	Monocacy River
Puckum Dam	8 ft (2.4 m)	2007	Dorchester County; 38.6090°N 75.8154°W	Puckum Branch	Nanticoke River
Bloede Dam	34 ft (10 m)	2018	Elkridge; 39.247°N 76.7612°W	Patapsco River	Patapsco River
Simkins Dam	10 ft (3.0 m)	2010	Baltimore County; 39.2527°N 76.7683°W	Patapsco River	Patapsco River
Union Dam	24 ft (7.3 m)	2010	Baltimore County; 39.2946°N 76.78°W	Patapsco River	Patapsco River
Pittsburgh Plate & Glass (PPG) Dam	10 ft (3.0 m)	2007	Cumberland; 39.5802°N 78.7444°W	North Branch Potomac River	Potomac River
Raven Rock Dam	6.5 ft (2.0 m)	2007	Washington County; 39.6651°N 77.5422°W	Little Antietam Creek	Potomac River
Polly Pond Dam	25 ft (7.6 m)	2002	Allegany County	Big Run	Potomac River
Chevy Chase Lake Dam		1937	Chevy Chase; 38.994815°N 77.073111°W	Coquelin Run	Potomac River
Bishopville Dam	4 ft (1.2 m)	2014	Worcester County; 38.4423°N 75.1944°W	St. Martin River	St. Martin River
Octoraro Dam		2005	Rising Sun; 39.7017°N 76.1267°W	Octoraro Creek	Susquehanna River
Town Creek Dam	5 ft (1.5 m)				
Dam #3 Ruins	6 ft (1.8 m)	1991			
Bacon Ridge Branch Weir		1991		Bacon Ridge Branch	
Deep Run Dam		1989		Deep Run	
Railroad Trestle Dam		1994		Dorsey Run	
Horsepen Branch Dam		1995		Horsepen Branch	
Railroad Bridge at Elkton Dam		1992		Little Elk Creek	
Stony Run Dam		1990		Stony Run	
Route 214 Dam		1998		Western Branch	
