= Pine Knot Creek =

Stream in Georgia, U.S.

Coordinates: 32°26′10.52″N 84°45′39.74″W

Pine Knot Creek is a stream in the U.S. state of Georgia.

Pine Knot Creek was named after the pine trees which are abundant in Georgia.
