= Riverview Dam =

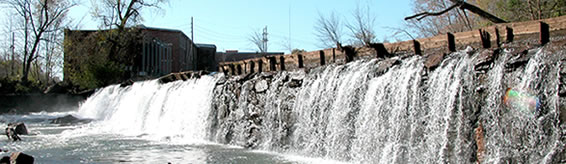
- Riverview Dam

- Location within Georgia
- Location: Harris County, Georgia / Chambers County, Alabama
- Coordinates: 32.7928°N 85.1431°W
- Primary inflows: Chattahoochee River
- Primary outflows: Chattahoochee River
- Basin countries: United States
- Surface elevation: 554.5 ft (169.0 m)

Riverview Dam is a lowhead dam on the Chattahoochee River. The dam was built in 1918 to provide power for Riverview Textile Mill. The dam is currently owned by Georgia Power.

Georgia Power has applied for permission to remove Riverview Dam in 2023.
