= Westminster, Maryland =

- City
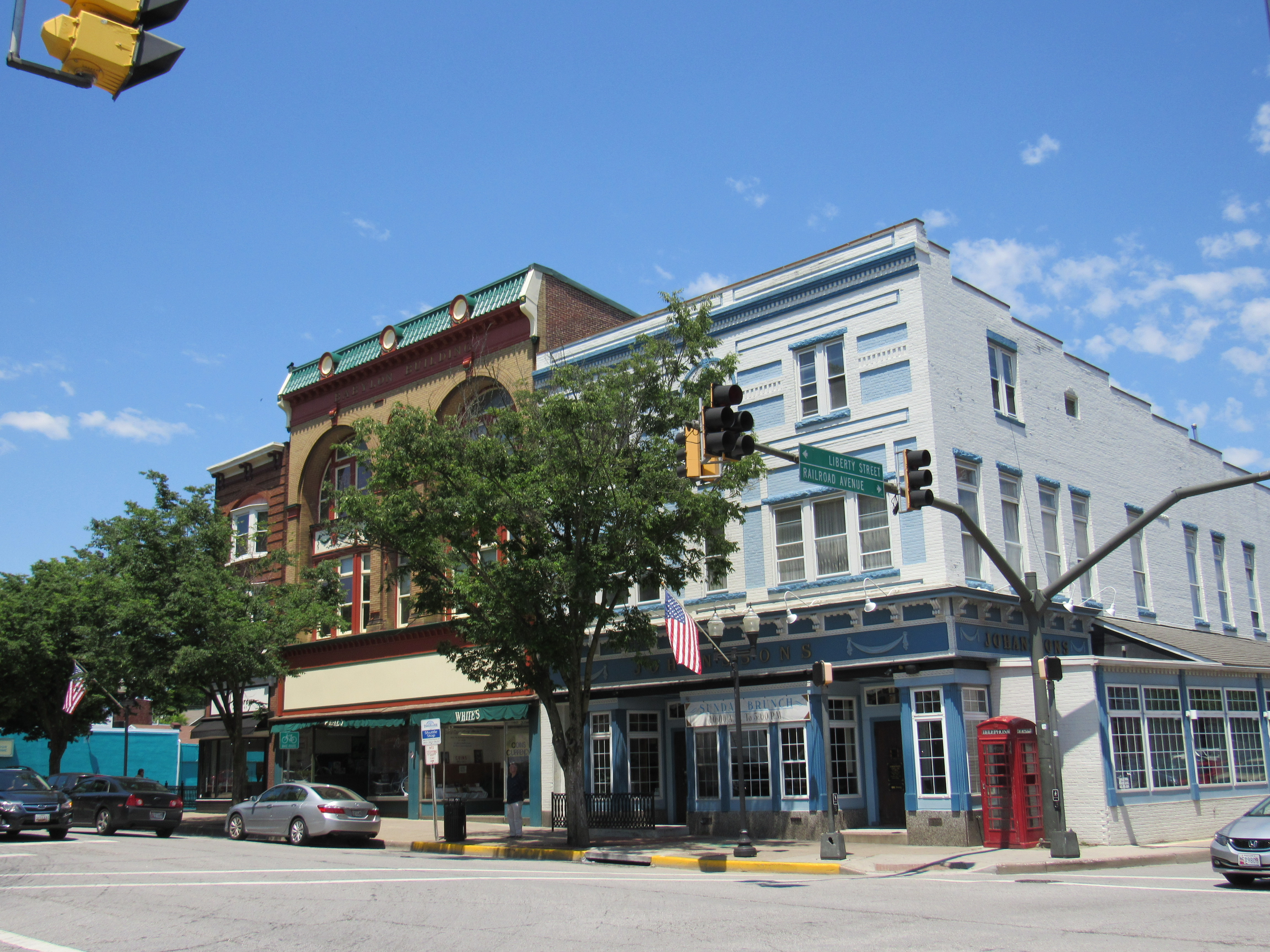
- Main Street in Westminster, Maryland

- Seal
- Motto: "Where history meets tomorrow"
- Location in Maryland
- Coordinates: 39°34′36″N 77°0′0″W
- Country: United States
- State: Maryland
- County: Carroll
- Founded: 1764
- Incorporated: 1818

Government
  - Mayor: Mona Becker

Area
  - Total: 6.65 sq mi (17.23 km^{2})
  - Land: 6.64 sq mi (17.20 km^{2})
  - Water: 0.012 sq mi (0.03 km^{2})
- Elevation: 764 ft (233 m)

Population (2020)
  - Total: 20,126
  - Density: 3,030.8/sq mi (1,170.19/km^{2})
- Time zone: UTC−5 (Eastern)
  - Summer (DST): UTC−4 (EDT)
- ZIP codes: 21157-21158
- Area codes: 410, 443, and 667
- FIPS code: 24-83100
- GNIS feature ID: 0595080
- Website: www.westminstermd.gov

Westminster is a city in and the county seat of Carroll County, Maryland, United States. The city's population was 19,960 at the 2020 census. Westminster is an outlying community in the Baltimore metropolitan area, which is part of the greater Washington–Baltimore combined statistical area.

== History ==
William Winchester (1706-1790) purchased approximately 167 acres of land in the area in 1754, which became known as White's Level and later the town of Winchester. In 1768, the Maryland General Assembly changed the name of the town to Westminster to avoid confusion with Winchester, Virginia.

On June 28, 1863, the Civil War skirmish of Corbit's Charge was fought in the streets of Westminster, when two companies of Delaware cavalry attacked a much larger Confederate force under General J. E. B. Stuart. This action delayed Stuart's forces from their joining the Battle of Gettysburg.

In April 1865, Joseph Shaw, editor for the Western Maryland Democrat, suffered an attack at his paper: his presses were wrecked and his business destroyed. He was subsequently beaten and stabbed to death by four men in Westminster, allegedly because of an anti-Lincoln editorial that he published the week before the assassination of the president. In a later trial at the Westminster Court House, the four men were acquitted; they had claimed "self-defense" in their case.

Since 1868, Westminster has held an annual Memorial Day parade, which is one of the longest continuously running Memorial Day parades in the country.

Just north of Westminster is the farm at which Whittaker Chambers hid the so-called "Pumpkin Papers" in a notorious mid-20th century case.

A historic marker states that Westminster was the first place in the nation to offer Rural Free Delivery postal service.

On March 10, 2006, members of the Westboro Baptist Church picketed the funeral of Matthew A. Snyder at St. John Catholic Church in Westminster. He had been killed in the Iraq War. Snyder's father sued the Baptist church for violating his privacy; the United States Supreme Court ruled in favor of the church on free speech grounds in Snyder v. Phelps.

On June 26, 2015, the city of Westminster lit the Westminster Fiber Network, the first community-wide gigabit fiber to the premise network in the Mid-Atlantic region. The city partnered with Ting Inc., a subsidiary of Tucows, to light the network and provide gigabit services.

== Geography ==
Westminster is located at 39°34′36″N 77°0′0″W (39.576551, −77.000120). Westminster is approximately 36.5 miles (58.7 km) driving distance northwest of Baltimore and 37.5 miles (60.4 km) driving distance southwest of York, Pennsylvania.

According to the U.S. Census Bureau, the city has a total area of 6.64 square miles (17.20 km^{2}), of which 6.63 square miles (17.17 km^{2}) is land and 0.01 square miles (0.03 km^{2}) is water. Westminster has access to two water reservoirs at present, Liberty and Piney Run; the county has also proposed a Union Mills Reservoir and Gillis Falls Reservoir.

=== Climate ===
Westminster lies in the humid subtropical climate zone bordering on a humid continental climate, with hot and humid summers and cool winters with highly variable seasonal snowfall. Due to its elevation and distance from the Chesapeake Bay and Baltimore's urban heat island, temperatures in Westminster are often lower than in Baltimore, especially at night.

Climate data for Westminster, Maryland, 1981–2010 normals, extremes 1979–2013
Month	Jan	Feb	Mar	Apr	May	Jun	Jul	Aug	Sep	Oct	Nov	Dec	Year
Record high °F (°C)	77 (25)	76 (24)	87 (31)	94 (34)	95 (35)	99 (37)	103 (39)	101 (38)	98 (37)	91 (33)	85 (29)	78 (26)	103 (39)
Mean maximum °F (°C)	59.3 (15.2)	62.0 (16.7)	72.7 (22.6)	83.0 (28.3)	88.4 (31.3)	93.8 (34.3)	95.3 (35.2)	93.7 (34.3)	89.8 (32.1)	80.3 (26.8)	72.1 (22.3)	62.3 (16.8)	96.7 (35.9)
Mean daily maximum °F (°C)	41.3 (5.2)	44.9 (7.2)	54.2 (12.3)	66.1 (18.9)	75.2 (24.0)	84.0 (28.9)	87.6 (30.9)	85.3 (29.6)	78.4 (25.8)	67.6 (19.8)	56.0 (13.3)	43.9 (6.6)	65.4 (18.5)
Daily mean °F (°C)	31.6 (−0.2)	34.6 (1.4)	42.3 (5.7)	53.3 (11.8)	62.3 (16.8)	71.4 (21.9)	75.5 (24.2)	73.3 (22.9)	66.6 (19.2)	55.6 (13.1)	45.3 (7.4)	35.1 (1.7)	53.9 (12.2)
Mean daily minimum °F (°C)	21.9 (−5.6)	24.2 (−4.3)	30.4 (−0.9)	40.4 (4.7)	49.4 (9.7)	58.8 (14.9)	63.3 (17.4)	61.4 (16.3)	54.9 (12.7)	43.6 (6.4)	34.6 (1.4)	26.2 (−3.2)	42.4 (5.8)
Mean minimum °F (°C)	8.3 (−13.2)	11.4 (−11.4)	16.7 (−8.5)	28.3 (−2.1)	38.1 (3.4)	48.6 (9.2)	55.9 (13.3)	54.4 (12.4)	43.4 (6.3)	32.0 (0.0)	23.6 (−4.7)	13.4 (−10.3)	4.1 (−15.5)
Record low °F (°C)	−13 (−25)	−4 (−20)	−4 (−20)	16 (−9)	28 (−2)	34 (1)	40 (4)	43 (6)	31 (−1)	24 (−4)	14 (−10)	−5 (−21)	−13 (−25)
Average precipitation inches (mm)	2.88 (73)	2.49 (63)	3.59 (91)	3.50 (89)	4.15 (105)	3.92 (100)	4.32 (110)	3.72 (94)	4.28 (109)	3.64 (92)	3.27 (83)	3.64 (92)	43.40 (1,102)
Average snowfall inches (cm)	7.3 (19)	6.5 (17)	2.7 (6.9)	0.1 (0.25)	0.0 (0.0)	0.0 (0.0)	0.0 (0.0)	0.0 (0.0)	0.0 (0.0)	0.0 (0.0)	0.9 (2.3)	2.5 (6.4)	20.0 (51)
Average precipitation days (≥ 0.01 in)	8.4	8.1	9.9	10.6	11.9	9.8	8.8	8.4	7.8	7.2	8.9	8.9	108.7
Average snowy days (≥ 0.1 in)	3.0	1.9	1.2	0.1	0.0	0.0	0.0	0.0	0.0	0.0	0.3	1.1	7.6
Source 1: NOAA
Source 2: XMACIS2

=== Tornado activity ===
Westminster's historical tornado activity is slightly above the Maryland state average and 38% greater than the overall U.S. average. On April 15, 1952, an F3 tornado (which has wind speeds of 158–206 mph) hit 15.5 miles from the city center, injuring four people and causing between $500,000 and $5,000,000 in damages. On July 19, 1996, an F3 tornado struck 5.5 miles away from the Westminster city center, injuring three people and causing $5 million in damages. On April 16, 2011, a tornado touched down around 8:00 pm EST. Shortly after sunrise on February 7, 2020, an EF1 tornado crossed directly over downtown, heading parallel to Maryland 27 northward on the west side. This damaged siding and shingles on multiple structures and brought down several trees. Schools across much of the county took shelter due to the tornado warning.

== Demographics ==
Historical population
Census	Pop.	Note	%±
1850	884		—
1870	2,310		—
1880	2,507		8.5%
1890	2,908		16.0%
1900	3,199		10.0%
1910	3,295		3.0%
1920	3,521		6.9%
1930	4,463		26.8%
1940	4,692		5.1%
1950	6,140		30.9%
1960	6,123		−0.3%
1970	7,207		17.7%
1980	8,808		22.2%
1990	13,068		48.4%
2000	16,731		28.0%
2010	18,590		11.1%
2020	20,126		8.3%
U.S. Decennial Census

=== 2020 census ===
As of the 2020 census, Westminster had a population of 20,126. The median age was 35.4 years. 21.9% of residents were under the age of 18 and 16.0% of residents were 65 years of age or older. For every 100 females there were 91.7 males, and for every 100 females age 18 and over there were 88.5 males age 18 and over.

100.0% of residents lived in urban areas, while 0.0% lived in rural areas.

There were 7,456 households in Westminster, of which 32.4% had children under the age of 18 living in them. Of all households, 40.6% were married-couple households, 19.8% were households with a male householder and no spouse or partner present, and 32.2% were households with a female householder and no spouse or partner present. About 33.7% of all households were made up of individuals and 16.2% had someone living alone who was 65 years of age or older.

There were 7,889 housing units, of which 5.5% were vacant. The homeowner vacancy rate was 1.2% and the rental vacancy rate was 5.9%.

Racial composition as of the 2020 census
Race	Number	Percent
White	15,163	75.3%
Black or African American	1,752	8.7%
American Indian and Alaska Native	83	0.4%
Asian	649	3.2%
Native Hawaiian and Other Pacific Islander	14	0.1%
Some other race	836	4.2%
Two or more races	1,629	8.1%
Hispanic or Latino (of any race)	1,909	9.5%

=== 2010 census ===
As of the census of 2010, there were 18,590 people, 7,161 households, and 4,117 families living in the city. The population density was 2,803.9 inhabitants per square mile (1,082.6/km^{2}). There were 7,684 housing units at an average density of 1,159.0 per square mile (447.5/km^{2}). The racial makeup of the city was 86.0% White, 7.0% African American, 0.3% Native American, 2.2% Asian, 1.9% from other races, and 2.5% from two or more races. Hispanic or Latino of any race were 6.0% of the population. 40% of Latinos in Westminster were of Mexican descent, 16% were of Puerto Rican descent, and 3% were of Cuban descent. 60% of Westminster's Latino population identified as White, 4% identified as Afro-Latino, 6% identified as being of more than one race, and 29% identified as some other race. Non-Hispanics in Westminster were predominantly White; 88% of non-Hispanics were White and 7% were African-American.

There were 7,161 households, of which 32.6% had children under the age of 18 living with them, 40.5% were married couples living together, 12.3% had a female householder with no husband present, 4.7% had a male householder with no wife present, and 42.5% were non-families. 35.5% of all households were made up of individuals, and 16.6% had someone living alone who was 65 years of age or older. The average household size was 2.39 and the average family size was 3.12.

The median age in the city was 33.3 years. 22.9% of residents were under the age of 18; 15% were between the ages of 18 and 24; 26.6% were from 25 to 44; 21.9% were from 45 to 64; and 13.5% were 65 years of age or older. The gender makeup of the city was 47.5% male and 52.5% female.

== Economy ==
=== Top employers ===
According to the City of Westminster, the top employers in the city are:

#	Employer	Employees
1	Carroll County Public Schools	3,757
2	McDaniel College	641
3	Carroll County	593
4	Carroll Lutheran Village	437
5	General Dynamics Robotics Systems	350
6	C.J. Miller	245
7	S.H. Tevis & Son	238
8	Truist Financial	174
9	PNC Financial Services	171
10	Landmark Community Newspapers	164

The five largest employers just outside Westminster in Carroll County are:

#	Employer	Employees
1	Carroll Hospital Center	1,696
2	Random House	800
3	Carroll Community College	509
4	English American Tailoring	385
5	Knorr Brake	260

== Arts and culture ==
=== Hashawha Tower ===
The Hashawha Tower is a windmill in Westminster. It stands at the Hashawha Environmental Center.

=== Annual events ===
Many annual events are hosted by the city government, Carroll County Arts Council, Carroll County Public Schools, Carroll County Farm Museum & Agriculture Center, and other community organizations:

- African American Read-In (February)
- Youth Art Month (March)
- Celtic Canter (March)
- PEEPshow (March–April)
- Wine Stroll (April)
- Main Street Mile (April)
- Westminster High School Culture Fest (May)
- Flower & Jazz Festival (May)
- Memorial Day Parade
- Downtown Westminster Farmers' Market (May–November)
- Deer Creek Fiddlers' Convention (June)
- Art in the Park (June)
- Carroll County Celtic Festival (June)
- Beer and BBQ Stroll (June)
- Reese VFC Carnival (June)
- Carroll County 4th of July Celebration
- Westminster Pride Festival (July)
- Roots Music & Arts Festival (July)
- Carroll County 4-H & FFA Fair (July–August)
- Maryland SummerFest (August)
- Reese VFC Car & Truck Show (August)
- Maryland Wine Festival (September)
- FallFest (September)
- Oktoberfest (October)
- Oyster Stroll (October)
- Festival of Wreaths (November–December)

== Education ==
The Carroll County Public Schools (CCPS) system enrolls over 28,000 students, which makes it the ninth largest school system in the state of Maryland. In Carroll County there are seven comprehensive high schools as well as two career and technology centers and an alternative school, The Gateway School. Students in grades 9 through 12 attend one of seven Carroll County high schools. Carroll County has 23 elementary schools and 9 middle schools. In the city of Westminster, there are two high schools, two middle schools and five elementary schools.

Westminster is home to McDaniel College, the Civil Air Patrol's National Honor Guard Academy, and Dream Flight School, an institution providing flight lessons at the local airport.

== Transportation ==
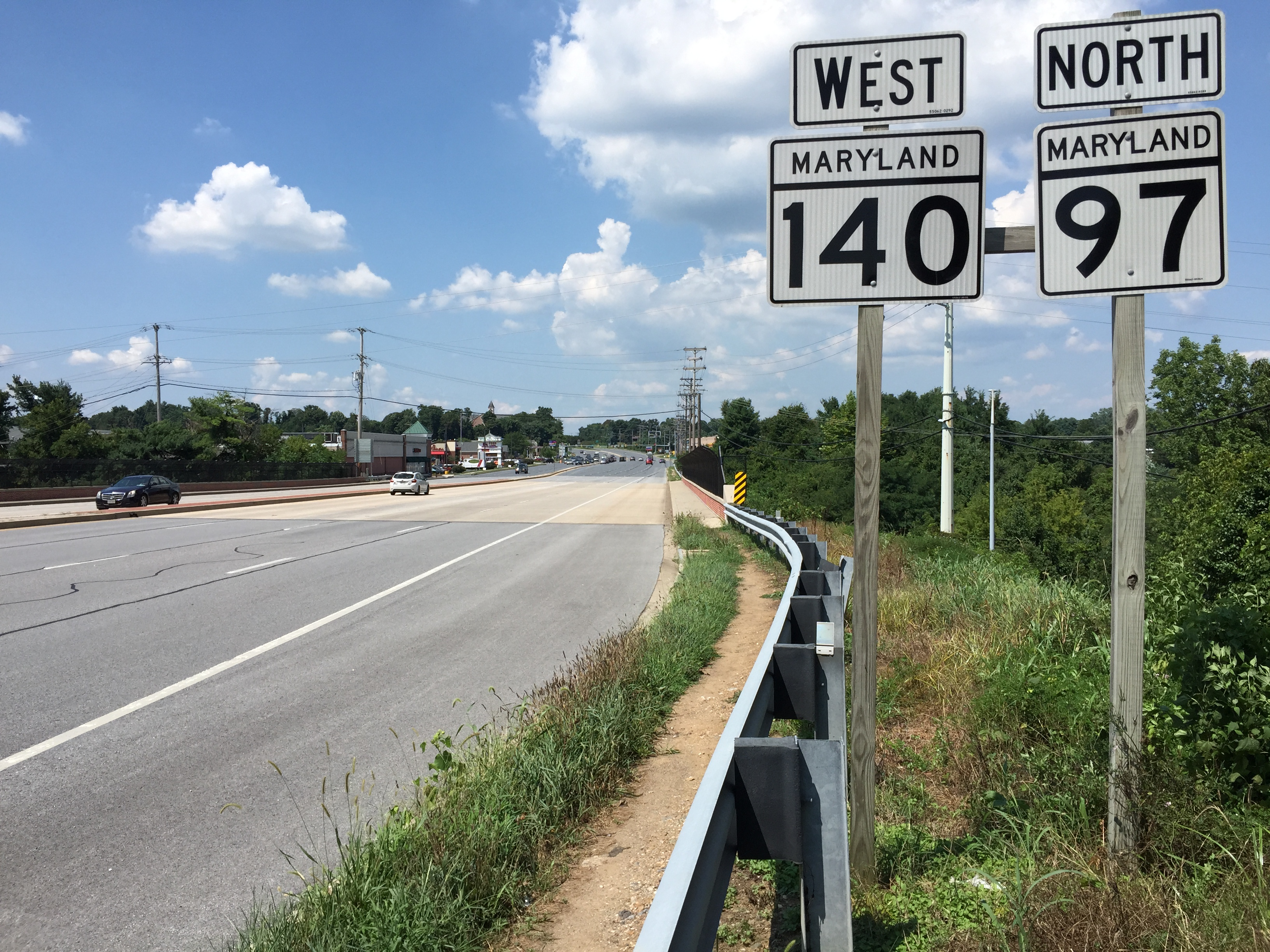
MD 140 and MD 97 run concurrently for part of their route through Westminster

The main method of travel to and from Westminster is by road and four primary highways serve the city. The most prominent of these is Maryland Route 140, which follows an east-southeast to west-northwest alignment across the area. To the southeast, MD 140 connects to Baltimore, while northwestward, it passes through Taneytown on its way to Emmitsburg. Maryland Route 97 is the next most important highway serving the city, providing the most direct route southward towards Washington, D.C. Two other primary highways, Maryland Route 27 and Maryland Route 31 provide connections to other towns in the area.

Due to long-standing opposition to mass transit from local residents and politicians, there is no inter-county bus or rail transit linking Westminster to Baltimore County. A resolution passed by the Carroll County Board of Commissioners prohibits the Carroll Transit System from offering bus services into or out of the county.

== Notable people ==
- Elizabeth Ann Bennett, actress
- Brandt Bronico, soccer player
- Francis Butler, American politician
- Whittaker Chambers, former Soviet spy who testified against Alger Hiss
- Joshua W. Hering, American politician, physician and banker
- Chris & Jenna, Westminster indie piano pop duo
- Mike Jenkins, strongman, 2012 Arnold Classic Champion
- Bill Oakley, television writer and producer best known for The Simpsons
- Sargent Shriver, American diplomat, politician, and activist
- Clyfford Still, renowned American abstract expressionist painter; owned a farm nearby
- Joseph Will, actor
- Theodore E. Woodward, Nobel Prize nominee, renowned researcher in the field of medicine

== Sister city ==
- Paide, Järva County, Estonia

== In popular culture ==
Main Street in Westminster was used as a location for the filming of For Richer or Poorer.
