= Paper (disambiguation) =

Paper is a thin, flat material produced by the compression of fibres.

Paper(s) or The Paper may also refer to:

== Publishing and academia ==
- Newspaper, a periodical publication
- Paper (magazine), an American monthly fashion and culture magazine
- The Paper (newspaper), a digital newspaper from Shanghai, China
- The Paper (American newspaper), a 1960s underground newspaper published in East Lansing, Michigan, United States
- Papers (software), a reference management package
- Scholarly paper, in academic publishing, a work published in a peer-reviewed journal
  - Scientific paper
- Term paper, a research paper written by a student as a school assignment

== Society, government, and business ==
- Aide-mémoire or non-paper, a document circulated in a meeting or summit for discussion purposes
- Banknote, or paper money
- Commercial paper, a type of unsecured promissory note
- Document, a physical representation of a body of information
  - Legal instrument or legal document
  - Identity documents
  - Breed registry or pedigreed animal documentation
- Paper (company), an education technology software company
- White paper, an authoritative report by a government or other organization
  - Green paper, in Europe, a non-committal report that may lead to a white paper
- Papers (information leaks), a popular term for leaks of financial or governmental data

== Popular culture ==
=== Film and television ===
- The Paper (film), a 1994 film directed by Ron Howard and starring Michael Keaton
- Paper (film), a 2010 Turkish film
- The Paper (2008 TV series), an American reality show
- "The Paper" (SpongeBob SquarePants)
- Papers (film), a 2025 thriller drama film directed by Arturo Montenegro
- Novine, a 2016 Croatian TV series translated into English as The Paper by international broadcasters
- Paper, a 2020 Indian web series by Ullu
- The Paper (2025 TV series), an American comedy series created by Greg Daniels

=== Music ===
- Paper (album), an album by Rich Robinson
- "Paper" (Krayzie Bone song), 1999
- "Paper" (Queen Latifah song), 1998
- "Paper" (Svala song), 2017
- "Papers" (song), a 2009 song by Usher
- "Paper", a song by Talking Heads from Fear of Music
- "Paper", a song by Falz from Moral Instruction

=== Other media ===
- Yomiko Readman or "The Paper", a fictional character in the Japanese light-novel series Read or Die and related manga and OVA
- Paper, a fictional character from Rock Paper Scissors
- Papers, a play by Allan Stratton

== Other ==
- Precision Array for Probing the Epoch of Reionization (PAPER), a radio telescope
- Facebook Paper, a defunct news portal, released 2014
- Dropbox Paper, a web-based document editing tool, released 2015
- Paper (king) (c. 14th century), ruler of Makuria

== See also ==
- Papier (disambiguation)
- Papër, a village in Albania
- Papar (disambiguation)
