= Paper Mill =

Paper Mill or papermills, may refer to:

== In general ==
- a paper mill, a factory which creates paper from pulp.
- Research paper mill, an organization which generates research papers or author credits for academics and researchers, to get around doing research work
- Term paper mill, an organization which generates essays for students, to get around writing their own papers for school work

== Places ==
- Paper Mill Playhouse, Millburn, Essex County, New Jersey, USA; a theatre
- Paper Mill Bridge, Bennington, Vermont, USA; a wooden covered bridge over the Walloomsac River
- Paper Mill Creek, Marin County, California, USA; a river
- Paper Mill Run, Philadelphia, Pennsylvania, USA; a river
- Paper Mill Road, Springfield Township, Delaware County, Pennsylvania, USa; see train station Paper Mill Road station

== Other uses ==
- "Papermill" (song), a 2010 song by Madvillain
- Aylesford Paper Mills F.C., a British soccer team in Aylesford, Kent, England, UK
- London Paper Mills F.C., a British soccer team in London, England, UK

== See also ==
- List of paper mills
- Diploma mill, an organization which generates educational certificates (ie. sheepskins, parchment)
- Paper (disambiguation)
- Mill (disambiguation)
