= Papier =

Papier may refer to:

- paper in French, Dutch, Afrikaans, Polish or German, word that can be found in the following expressions:
  - Papier-mâché, a construction material made of pieces of paper stuck together using a wet paste
  - Papier collé, a painting technique and type of collage
  - Papier d'Arménie, a perfume coated paper
  - Le papier ne peut pas envelopper la braise, a 2007 French-Cambodian documentary film directed by Rithy Panh
  - sans papiers, a term for Illegal immigrants in French
- Hans-Jürgen Papier (born 1943), a German scholar in Laws, Ex-President of the Federal Constitutional Court of Germany
- Papier (company), British company
- Papier (Reacher episode), a 2022 TV episode
