= Union Mills Reservoir =

Proposed, unfunded, unbuilt reservoir near Union Mills, Carroll County, Maryland, USA

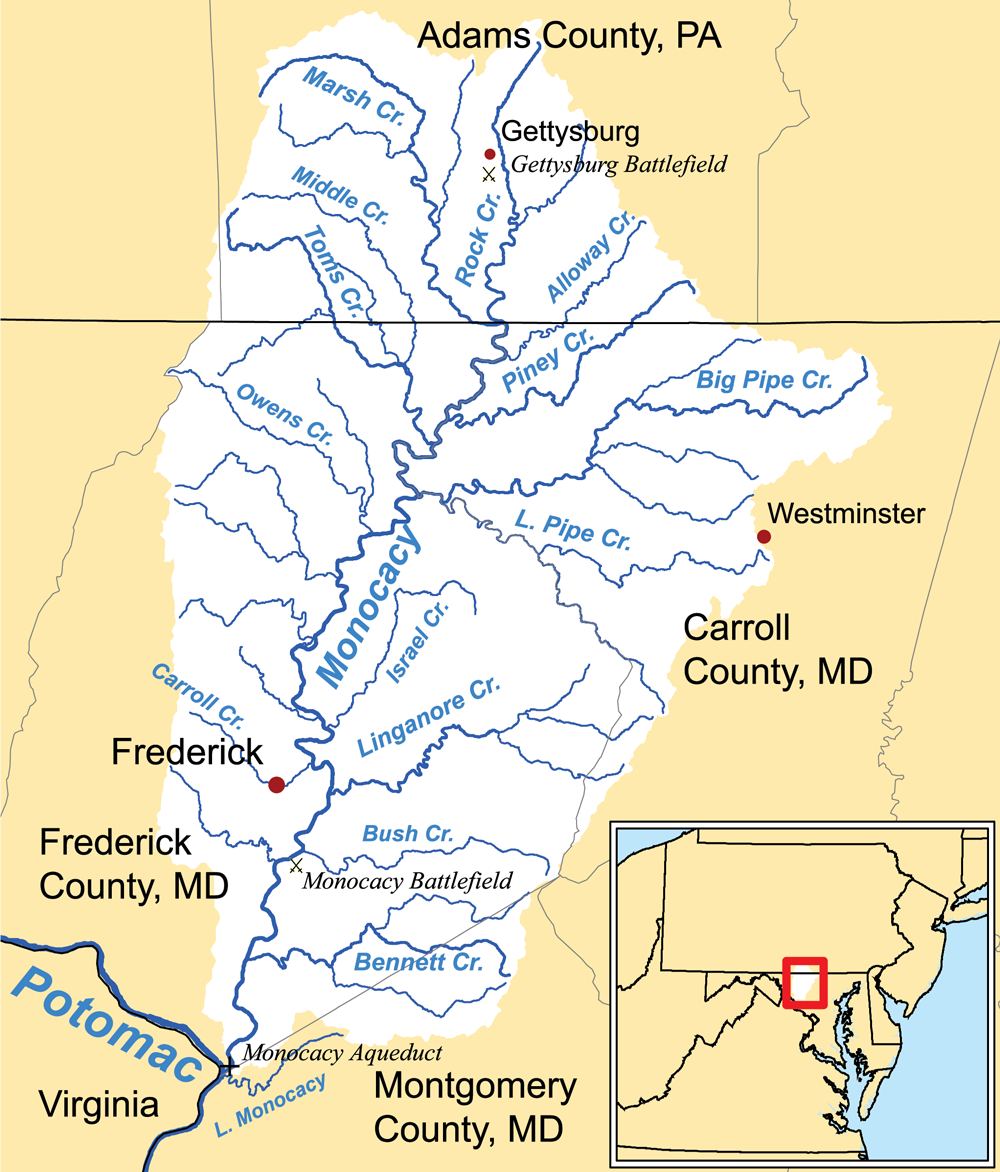
Watershed map showing Big Pipe, Little Pipe and Double Pipe Creek.

A proposed Union Mills Reservoir represents a half century of efforts by the Commissioners of the Carroll County, Maryland, to build variations on a "dam" or "reservoir" near Union Mills, Maryland, on the Big Pipe Creek, defeated by a petition led by the Carroll County Taxpayers' Committee in the 1970s. The plan may be alive among some county officials but may also be postponed "indefinitely." Land threatened by the reservoir includes the Whittaker Chambers Farm, also known as the Pipe Creek Farm, a National Historic Landmark as well as protected under the Maryland Agricultural Land Preservation Foundation (MALPF).

== Description ==
Permanently Preserved Through Easement

From FY 1980 through FY 2017, 70,311 acres were permanently preserved through easement programs, which is roughly 1/4 of the total county land area

— Carroll County Government, Environmental Stewardship in Carroll County 2017

According to a county report from the mid-1970s, the reservoir "will provide storage for sediment (1,125 acre-feet), flood control (6,414 acre-feet) municipal water supply (4,235 acre-feet) and recreation (1,210 acre-feet)." The reservoir would need 325 acres.

As for 2014, Carroll County government's plan was to have a Union Mills Reservoir provide 3.76 million/gallons/day with a normal pool elevation of 610 feet. The reservoir would serve as regional source of water supply for Westminster, Hampstead, Taneytown, and Manchester.

The Big Pipe Creek feeds into the Double Pipe Creek, which runs into the Monocacy River and on into the Chesapeake Bay.

== History ==
According to a 2010 plan published by the community of Hampstead, Maryland:

Since 1970, the Carroll County Water and Sewerage Master Plan has included the planned Union Mills Reservoir as a future water supply source to serve Hampstead, as well as Manchester and Westminster. The County has purchased a majority of the land needed for the reservoir. Community participants emphasized the importance of making realistic and concrete the plans for actually developing the reservoir as a water-supply resource that will adequately serve the Hampstead and Manchester communities.

=== 1970s ===
In the 1970s, Carroll County Commissioners made a first proposal for a dam or reservoir.

In 1975, the Maryland Soil Conservation Service issued a draft plan for a Big Pipe Creek Watershed, whose purposes were "primarily for flood control" and "secondarily for water supply."

In February 1976, a "Carroll County Taxpayers' Committee" promised to oppose to the dam, Ted Lissauer announced, who also promised a public petition. In March 1976, the committee published an Opposition Statement to the Big Pipe Creek Watershed Plan. The committee also held a public informational meeting on the "Union Mills Dam controversy." In June 1976, Carroll County Commissioners published a report called Big Pipe Creek Watershed: Plan and Environmental Impact Statement. In its first pages appeared a five-page "agreement" signed by the "chairman" of a "Carroll County Conservation District," the president and secretary of the Carroll County Commissioners, a State Conservationist, and a "secretary" of the State of Maryland. It claimed to represent an agreement by the Carroll County Conservation District, the State of Maryland, and the United States Department of Agriculture (though no USDA official signed). The agreement would allow the Carroll County Commissioners to acquire land along the Big Pipe Creek for "improvements" to include a "multiple purpose reservoir and basic recreational facilities," paid for by the county. The report appeared in an appendix in the Federal Register dated August 1976 under "environmental impact statements which were reviewed and not commented on between July 1 and 31, 1976." The county's report included "only excerpts" from the Carroll County Taxpayers' Committee's opposition statement as 21 comments, followed by lengthy responses, all of which the country rejected or dismissed its responses. For example, when the committee complained that the costs of more than $6,000,000 hardly justified $16,000 in flood control benefits and thus had "no real flood control benefits," the country responded that these costs "should not be compared." (A full copy of the opposition statement went to the State Conservationist's Office, Soil Conservation Service, in College Park, Maryland).

The Carroll County Taxpayers' Committee raised more than 5,000 signatures for its petition (as required by law) to stop the dam.

On June 7, 1976, the Evening Sun of Hanover, Pennsylvania, asked, "Why is the Union Mills dam project like a Chinese nuzzle?" It answered, "Every time the pieces seem to fall into place, complicated new pieces appear." It cited a new statement from Carroll County Taxpayer Committee spokesperson Ted Lissauer: "The county will take 860 acres of land in the Bachman Valley, of which up to 505 acres will be subject to flooding during rains. This destruction of federally regulated wetlands is excessive, considering the minimal flood protection provided downstream according to the Environmental Protection Agency-Philadelphia office."

=== 1980s ===
In August 1989, the Caroll County Times reporter that "If the Union Mills dam is ever built, there could be problems making the water fit to drink," according to Carroll County government official, due to "fecal coliform bacteria levels." The newspaper also recalled that in 1976 Carroll County Taxpayers Committee spokesperson Ted Lissauer had argued, "Carroll County had adequate groundwater."

=== 1990s ===
According to the Washington Examiner, "the process hit a wall in 1990, county Planning Director Steven Horn said, when it appeared that the Environmental Protection Agency would not approve plans, so the county withdrew its applications." According to the newspaper, "federal officials were worried about the environmental effect of flooding acres of ecosystem." Driving the push for new reservoirs is "unprecedented growth."

=== 2000s, 2010s, 2020s ===
Postponed Indefinitely

Carroll County decided to postpone indefinitely the development of the Union Mills Reservoir. More recently, in 2016, the County has indicated... that they are no longer interested in the reservoir project.

— Global Rule of Law & Liberty Legal Defense Fund (d/b/a The Global Liberty Alliance), The Whittaker Chambers Farm (A.K.A. Pipe Creek Farm) in Westminster, Maryland

In the 2000s, Carroll County officials renewed efforts to claim property for a dam along the Big Pipe Creek, including plans for a Union Mills reservoir.

In 2005, Carroll County government made a "Reservoir Watershed Management Agreement of 2005", first signed in 1979, between Baltimore City, Carroll County, Maryland Department of Environment, Maryland Department of Agriculture, Baltimore County Soil Conservation District, Carroll County Soil Conservation District, Baltimore Metropolitan Council, and a Reservoir Watershed Protection Committee. With regard to three existing water supply reservoirs" (Loch Raven, Liberty, and Prettyboy), all owned and operated by Baltimore City, the agreement's "most important goal of the agreement is to maintain high quality drinking water for metropolitan Baltimore including parts of Carroll, Baltimore, Howard and Anne Arundel counties and provide habitat and recreational uses."

In 2006, Carroll County government announced renewed intentions to build a "Union Mills reservoir, proposed north of Westminster, and the Gillis Falls reservoir, proposed for Mount Airy" by seeking approval from the Maryland Department of Planning. Affected residents expressed opposition, particularly concerned over proximity to a pollution from a John Owings landfill — "a former dump that leaches chemicals."

In January 2007, according to a blog, Carroll Counter commissioners received letters from members of the United States Congress on behalf of the Whittaker Chambers Farm. In a letter dated January 7, 2007, Roscoe Bartlett wrote, "It is my hope that the Commissioners of Carroll County will value, even treasure, this very special farm, that you will do all in your power to keep it whole, and protect its integrity for this and future generations to study and know." A letter dated January 12, 2007, came from twelve members of the United States Congress: Roscoe Bartlett, Wayne Gilchrest, Mario Díaz-Balart, Ileana Ros-Lehtinen, Frank Wolf, Joe Wilson, Steve King, Madeleine Bordallo, Tom Feeney, John Boozman, Thaddeus McCotter, and Lincoln Diaz-Balart. The letter said, "We understand that the Carroll County Commissioners are considering a water plan that includes the creation of a Union Mills reservoir which, if completed, would destroy a significant portion of this national treasure." On January 18, 2007, Carroll Counter commissioners responded, "The need for a surface water supply for communities in northern Carroll County is real. We also believe that protecting and preserving nationally recognized sites of historic significance and irreplaceable farmland is equally important to our local, state and national well being. Our reservoir concept, with minimal impact to the Pipe Creek Farm, satisfies both of these fundamental principles of government: protecting our past while planning for our future." In March 2007, the Baltimore Sun newspaper reported that the county was considering surface water options "including proposed reservoirs at Union Mills and Gillis Falls," alternatives planned "since the 1970s.". The Sun also reported:

For the long term, Westminster is examining the county's revived plans for two reservoirs, one at Union Mills and the other at Gillis Falls. But those projects face significant federal hurdles, will take 10 years to complete and cost at least $166 million to construct, county officials said.
"Water projects are going to be a major factor in our [community investment plans] for some years to come," Ted Zaleski, the county budget director, said yesterday.
he federal Army Corps of Engineers and the Environmental Protection Agency discouraged Carroll's twin reservoir projects when they were first pressed in the 1970s and 1980s. But with the state now pushing groundwater restrictions, county officials are hopeful that dam projects may again become feasible.
"It is the primary resource that is going to have to be there," Ferguson said of the Union Mills reservoir site. "We cannot continue to rely on groundwater."

In June 2007, Whittaker Chambers' son objected to new efforts by the county. "This is where my parents died," he told the Baltimore Sun. He had recently bought back that farmstead of the Whittaker Chambers Farm to reform the full farm. "My end-of-life goal has been to reassemble it and make it available to the next generation as a farm." (In 1949, Whittaker Chambers told newspapers, "I am not selling my farm now, and I have no intention of doing so. I expect to live here the rest of my life.")

During a public hearing on March 9, 2010, the County heard comments on a draft water resources element (WRE) from the members of the public, who argued:

1. Carroll County has sufficient water now and in future without a reservoir
2. Proximity of the John Owings landfill raises questions about contamination of a reservoir
3. No one from Carroll County government had discussed the proposed reservoir or its effects, e.g., flooding
4. 21 communities as water/sewer problem areas since the 1990s went unmentioned in the WRE
5. Piney Run did not appear in the WRE as an alternative for future drinking water supply
6. The US Army Corps of Engineers had already advised against a Gillis Falls Reservoir
7. Carroll County government should stop the 35% general leaks in municipal systems before considering any new sources
8. Carroll County government should ask for some funds to restore the Chesapeake Bay to restore the Bear Branch of the Big Pipe Creek

Tom Devilbiss, deputy director of Carroll County's Department of Planning, stated that planning commissions would review comments and make changes to the draft as they saw fit without further requirement fr public hearing.

As of December 2010, Carroll County government had 65% of property (land) for its proposed Union Mills Reservoir (and 83% for the proposed Gillis Fall Reservoir).

In 2012, Carroll County government officials made statements about the Union Mills reservoir project. Tom Rio, director of public works for Carroll County, stated that fresh water supplies were "limited" in the county, thus the county's plans for the Union Mills reservoir. Therefore, the county purchased two houses that the reservoir would "directly" impact. Then, Rio admitted, "The properties wouldn't exactly be under water if the project gets under way." However, Tom Devilbiss, deputy director of the county's Department of Land Use, Planning and Development, stated "the likelihood of either of the reservoirs being constructed is questionable." He explained that the county was only in "initial stages" of searching for groundwater at the properties purchased. The county spent $179,000 for two houses with 32.1 acres associated with the Union Mills Reservoir project. Devilbiss estimated another 20 years, "if ever," until the building of a Union Mills Reservoir.

In 2014, a water and sewage master plan for Carroll County referred a Union Mills Reservoir "impoundment" for "long-term water supply needs." It also recommended for the long-term that the county main "long term water source options" at the proposed Union Mills Reservoir as well as a "York PA Water System," as well as "non-groundwater water supply." It intends the proposed reservoir for as "regional source of supply for Westminster, Hampstead, Taneytown, and Manchester Service Areas."

In December 2016, the Global Liberty Alliance Fund, to defend private property rights, started investigating Carroll County government's efforts on behalf of the Whittaker Chambers Farm. The Fund helped organize affected landowners and concerned citizens in contacting Members of Congress and other community leaders to help stop the reservoir. According to the Fund, Carroll County government "threatened" to confiscate property under eminent domain – "despite the fact that federal law regarding National Historic Landmarks states that the land must be preserved." The Fund claims that "16 Members of Congress also weighed in as well as and historians from several universities and academic institutions." In conclusion, the Fund reported that "Carroll County decided to postpone indefinitely the development of the Union Mills Reservoir" and "indicated... they are no longer interested in the reservoir project."

In 2017, Carroll County government published the statement: "From FY 1980 through FY 2017, 70,311 acres were permanently preserved through easement programs, which is roughly 1/4 of the total county land area", including Maryland Agricultural Land Preservation Foundation (MALPF). A map that appears on the same page depicts a majority of land not already purchased by the county for the proposed reservoir as permanently protected under MALPF.

== Fecal bacteria ==
Carroll County studies reveal a rising rate of fecal bacteria (here, Escherichia coli) in Carroll County waterways

Investigations, led by the Maryland Department of Environment and published in 2007 and 2009, into fecal bacteria in the Big Pipe Creek have shown significant increase. Major contributors to increased fecal bacteria are humans and domestic animals (pets), while potential to reduce fecal bacteria by more than 55% could be achieved also by humans and domestic animals (pets). The 2007 report mentions "pet waste" and mention "community and homeowner associations" as responsible for policies and campaigns to address pet waste. The MDE's 2009 report stated that "Multiple antibiotic resistance analysis (ARA) source tracking was used to determine the relative proportion of domestic (pets and human associated animals), human (human waste), livestock (agriculture-related animals), and wildlife (mammals and waterfowl) source categories." The report found that fecal bacteria could be reduced in a practicable manner by 95% among humans and 75% among domestic animals (pets), caused by 12/2% of land usage described as "urban" (humans, pets). The pores notes, "Nonpoint source contributions from human activities generally arise from failing septic systems and their associated drain fields or leaking infrastructure (i.e., sewer systems)." The report also notes "uncertainty" about the efficacy of "pet waste education programs."

In 2008, the Center for Watershed Protection, Inc.; Alliance for the Chesapeake Bay, and Home Builders Association of Maryland issued a Recommended Model Development Principles, submitted to the Carroll County government, "fostering more environmentally-sensitive site development in Carroll County," while conceding that "Deciding where to allow or encourage development and protect natural resources is a difficult issue that jurisdictions have to balance." The reported targeted an audience of four: local government (Carroll County), residential homeowners, land developers, environment (but no land owners including farmers). Numerous tables depicted every box checked to show due diligence for anti-degradation, National Pollutant Discharge Elimination System (NPDES), the 2005 watershed agreement, the 2007 Stormwater Management Act (HB 786), Total Maximum Daily Loads (TMDLs), and Water Resources Element Law. The report then summarizes, "Through the Roundtable process, Carroll County is taking an important step towards improving local water quality and quality of life for citizens (although the only "citizens" targeted as an audience are "homeowners".) All land-related images in the document depict single homes and no farmland. The Center for Watershed Protection has recommended the model.

By 2010, Carroll County government issued a 265-page Water Resources Element report that added another new purpose for the reservoir, namely income generator via export of water:

There are six existing or planned water supply reservoirs whose watersheds extend partially or entirely within Carroll County: Loch Raven, Prettyboy, Liberty, Piney Run, Gillis Falls, and Union Mills. Combined, these existing and planned reservoirs could potentially provide high-quality water for nearly 2 million people in Baltimore City and the five surrounding counties.

Four reservoirs already exist. Loch Raven, built in 1914, has a water capacity of 23 billion gallons. Prettyboy, completed in 1932, has a 19 billion water capacity. Liberty, completed 1956, has a 43 billion gallon water capacity. Piney Run, completed 1974, has a 2 billion gallon water capacity. Loch Raven and Prettyboy both lie in Baltimore County. Although Liberty lies between Baltimore and Carroll counties, City of Baltimore Department of Public Works owns it. Piney Run lies inside Carroll County. The proposed Gillis Falls and Union Mills reservoirs also lie within Carroll County, thus fall under control of Carroll County commissioners. Additionally, the report states "Most of the watersheds for these reservoirs are on the State’s list of 'impaired' waters" and adds:

Failing septic systems are a high-priority target for both nutrient reduction and protection of public health. Repair of a failing septic system, as well as connection to sanitary sewer or alternate treatment, would help reduce nutrient loading as well as address the problem of a failing septic for that affected homeowner. Leveraging of funds (e.g., the Bay Restoration Fund) to pay for such improvements may make it more cost effective.

The report recommends specific actions, including: "Incorporate the county’s open space and land preservation program measures," "Require watershed and wellhead protection," "Identify existing older water pipes in need of repair or replacement and program improvements," and "Annually locate and repair leaks in distribution system; all meters replaced a couple years ago; perform quarterly water loss audits; water loss currently 10-12 percent."

== Union Mills Wetlands ==
Just west of Maryland Route 97 "Littlestown Pike" next to Union Mills, Maryland, is an as-yet unofficial "Union Mills Wetlands," where eight or more streams converge with the Big Pipe Creek, which several nature groups recognize, including Carroll County Bird Club, eBird, and Birds & Blooms.

Another wetlands exists along the Little Pipe Creek, near Union Bridge, Maryland, also in Carroll County, less than fifteen miles from the Union Mills Wetlands.

According to Carroll County government, "Water Resource Management largely focuses on the protection of streams, ponds, and wetlands through the implementation of buffers and easements."

In 2015, Carroll County government announced:

In May of 2012, the Watershed Protection and Restoration Act of 2012 (HB 987) became law. The Bill requires Maryland’s 10 most populous jurisdictions, including Carroll County, to collect a Stormwater Remediation Fee to fund the implementation of local stormwater management practices, and stream and wetland restoration projects. The law’s intent is to assist counties in funding stormwater management in conformance with the Environmental Protection Agency’s mandated National Pollutant Discharge Elimination System (NPDES) Permit.

In August 2017, Carroll County government stated that one of its top three "environmental principles" was to "maintain safe and adequate drinking water and other water supplies including efforts to protect and restore the Chesapeake Bay." In the same document, rather than protect and restore the Chesapeake, the county emphasized (land) development in its third environmental goal ("protect and enhance the water quality of Carroll County’s rivers, streams, reservoirs, and aquifers; comply with applicable state and federal requirements related to water quality and quantity; and maintain and protect adequate water supplies to serve current and planned development"). In May 2020, the Center for Watershed Protection noted that a pilot study of the Airpark Business Center in Carroll County, Maryland, showed the "most noticeable response" to best management practices (BMPs) among three watersheds studied.

=== Bird watching ===
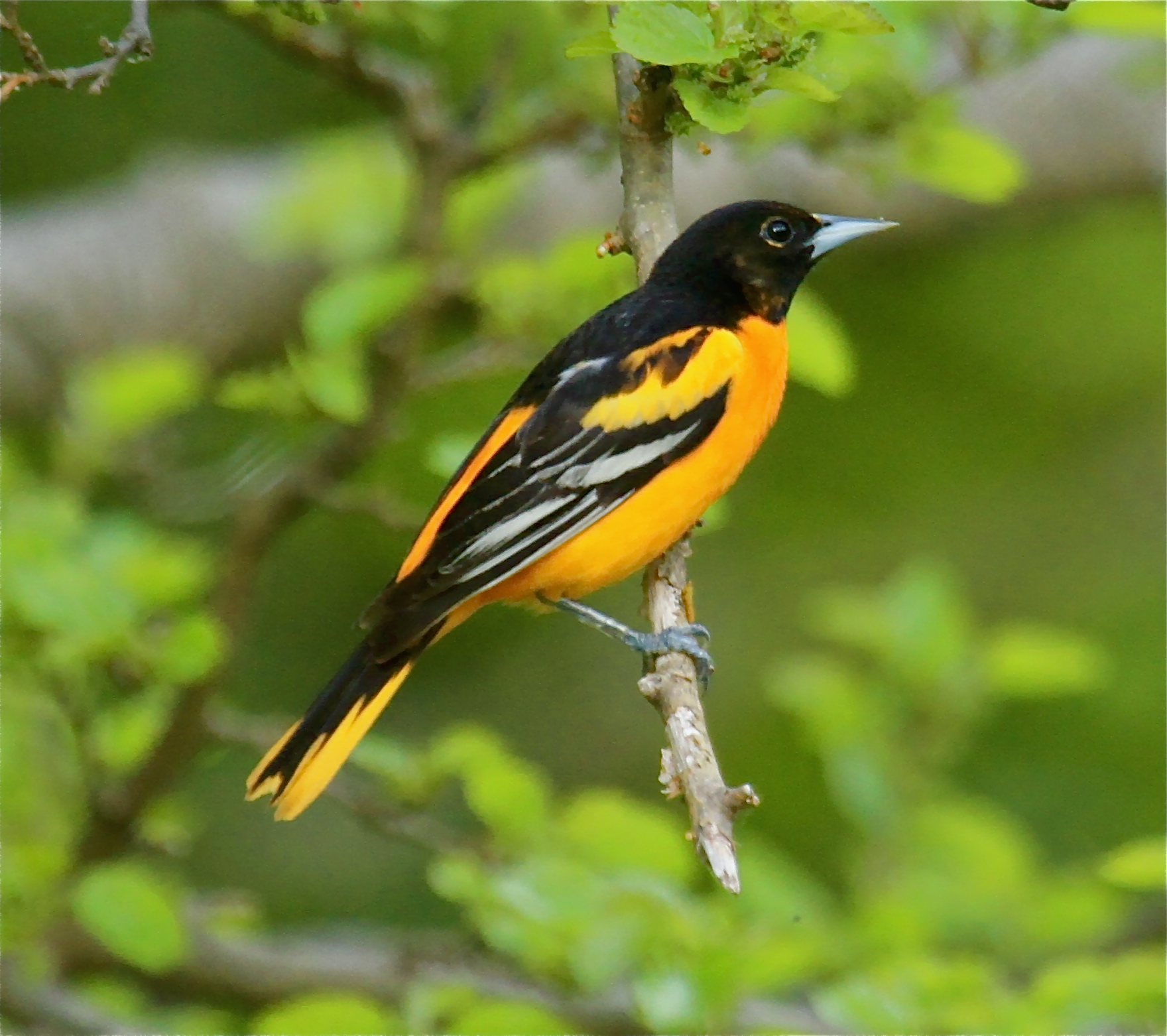
Birdwatchers in the area have seen many species including Maryland's official state bird, the Baltimore oriole.

The Carroll County Bird Club recommends Union Mills wetlands as an excellent environment in which to spot species such as the ruby-throated hummingbird, great blue heron, green heron, eastern kingbird, great egret, barred owl, red-headed woodpecker, downy woodpecker, red-bellied woodpecker, red-tailed hawk, wood duck, northern flicker, fish crow, eastern towhee, sora, swamp sparrow, yellow warbler, solitary sandpiper, indigo bunting, eastern bluebird, orchard oriole, and Baltimore oriole.

== Maps ==
An August 2003 "Stream Use & Drainage Basin Designation" map shows the creek and streams as part of the Double Pipe Creek drainage basin designation, including the Whittaker Chambers Farm. As an example, an October 2004 "Draft Water Resource Management Area Guidance Map" shows "proposed reservoir pool" along the edges of much of the Whittaker Chambers Farm, as well as "Surface Water Management Zone" that encroaches deeply into the farm, including road access.

On September 22, 2010, Carroll County government published a map called "Union Mills Reservoir Trails" referring to the unbuilt Union Mills Reservoir. A 2014 county master plan map, adopted as "Plan Resolution #938-2015 on February 26, 2015," shows a reservoir project that would surround and encroach, for example, on much of the Whittaker Chambers Farm. A second 2014 county master plan map shows a much larger reservoir area, e.g., showing not partial but majority use of the Whittaker Chambers Farm for either under water for "reservoir" or seized for "resource conservation." Another county map dated June 22, 2017, which "shows easements acquired as of 6/30/2017." For example, while it depicts the Whittaker Farm as under Maryland Agricultural Land Preservation Foundation (MAPLF) easement, it also shows that farm's center ("Medfield") circled in yellow as "designated/municipal growth area." A 2020 county zoning map shows many to-be-affected farms under either conservation or agriculture.

Carroll County Tourism refers to a "Union Mills Reservoir" Area which other tourism sites have started to use in reference to hiking and horseback riding. Some websites have only referred to a "Union Mills" trail. In 2020, several websites amended misleading titles from "Union Mills Reservoir" to "Union Mills Area" or "Union Mills Trail."

== See also ==
- Eminent domain
- Carroll County, Maryland
- Loch Raven Reservoir
- Prettyboy Reservoir
- Liberty Reservoir
- Piney Run Reservoir
- Union Mills, Maryland
- Westminster, Maryland
- Hampstead, Maryland
- Manchester, Maryland
- New Windsor, Maryland
- Taneytown, Maryland
- Union Bridge, Maryland
- Montgomery County, Maryland Agricultural Reserve
- Chesapeake Bay Program
