= Ted Knap =

American journalist (1920–2023)

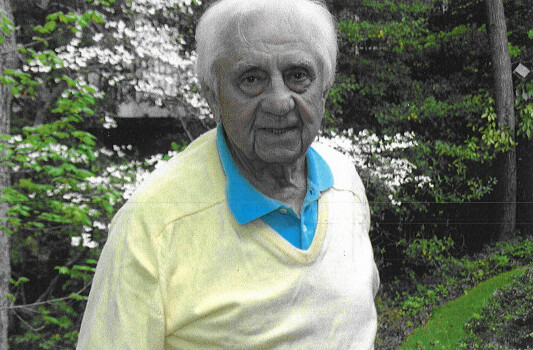

Thaddeus L. Knap (May 19, 1920 – February 26, 2023) was an American journalist. Starting off writing for newspapers in Wisconsin and Indiana, Knap went on to cover national politics in Washington, D.C.

== Early life and education ==
Knap was born in Milwaukee on May 19, 1920, to Polish immigrant parents. His parents had immigrated to the United States years earlier in search of a better life for themselves and their children.

Knap's interest in journalism began at an early age. As a young boy, he delivered the Milwaukee Journal to his neighbors. Knap would go on to write for his high school newspaper, covering the 1932 Democratic National Convention in Chicago.

Knap graduated from Marquette University in 1940 with a degree in journalism. He went on to work for the Waukesha Daily Freeman for a total of six years, both before and after fighting in World War II. Knap started out at the Freeman as a reporter, and went on to become city editor of the paper. After returning from his four years of service in the War, Knap married Eleanor Knoebel, to whom he remained married until her death in 2011.

== Career ==
After the Waukesha Daily Freeman, Knap wrote for the Indianapolis Times in 1950. He viewed this as a stepping stone to his dream job, reporting on Washington, D.C. He started off at the Times as a city desk reporter, moving on to become assistant editor, and eventually city editor for the paper. During his tenure, Knap uncovered various instances of scandal and corruption in the area. Notably, he exposed a practice within the Indianapolis Police Department of classifying a large number of crimes as being "under investigation," as opposed to an alternative designation. The purpose of this scheme was to artificially deflate the number of crimes reported to the Federal Bureau of Investigation in official crime statistics. For his reporting, Knap garnered a reputation among his colleagues (as well as local politicians) for his strong sense of journalistic duty.

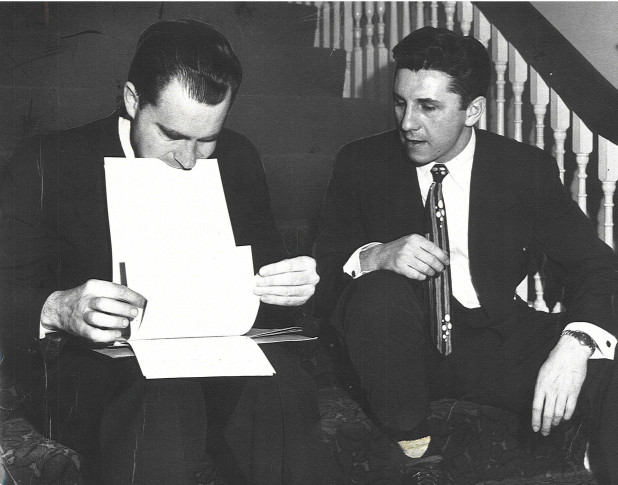
Rep. Richard M. Nixon (R. Calif.) reviews details of his "Pumpkin Papers" speech in 1950 with reporter Ted Knap after the Lincoln Day dinner in Waukesha, WI.

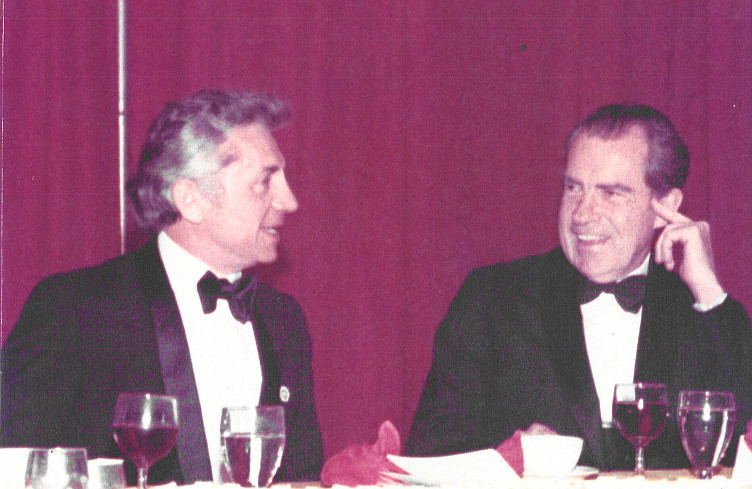
President Nixon and Knap at the White House Correspondents dinner.

In 1963 Knap became the Washington correspondent for the Indianapolis Times, as well as the Evansville Press. Knap covered, in 1963 alone, the assassination of President John F. Kennedy, the Vietnam War, and the ongoing Civil Rights Movement. On August 28, 1963, he participated in the March on Washington and covered Martin Luther King's I Have a Dream speech.

During his time in Washington, Knap covered presidents Lyndon Johnson, Richard Nixon, Gerald Ford, Jimmy Carter, and Ronald Reagan. Owing to his job as a journalist, Knap often had adversarial encounters with the politicians he covered, and found it difficult to maintain cordial relationships with them.

Knap was president of the White House Correspondents Association during the Watergate Scandal. President Nixon, known for his contentious relationship with the press, would go on to put Knap on his list of enemies. Knap often harangued Nixon regarding his policies regarding Vietnam, asking the president about his "secret plan" to end the war.

Honors and awards included induction into the Indiana Journalism Hall of Fame in 2007, the American Political Science Association (twice), the Marquette University By-Line Award, Sigma Delta Chi fraternity, and Indianapolis Press Club reporting awards.

== Personal life and death ==
Knap retired in 1985. He was a keen golfer, who won the Seniors' Championship at the International Country Club (Virginia) three times. At other courses, he broke 70 twice in a row. In other athletic triumphs, Knap scored what he claimed was the winning goal for Marquette University in a hockey game against the University of Wisconsin in 1939. After living in McLean, Virginia, for many years, he resided in Oconomowoc, Wisconsin.

Ted Knap's older brother was Tony Knap, American football coach, who died in October 2011, at age 96.

Knap was married to Eleanore Knoebel of Waukesha, who died in 2011. He died on February 26, 2023, at the age of 102.
