= Pumpkin Papers =

US government documents stolen in 1938

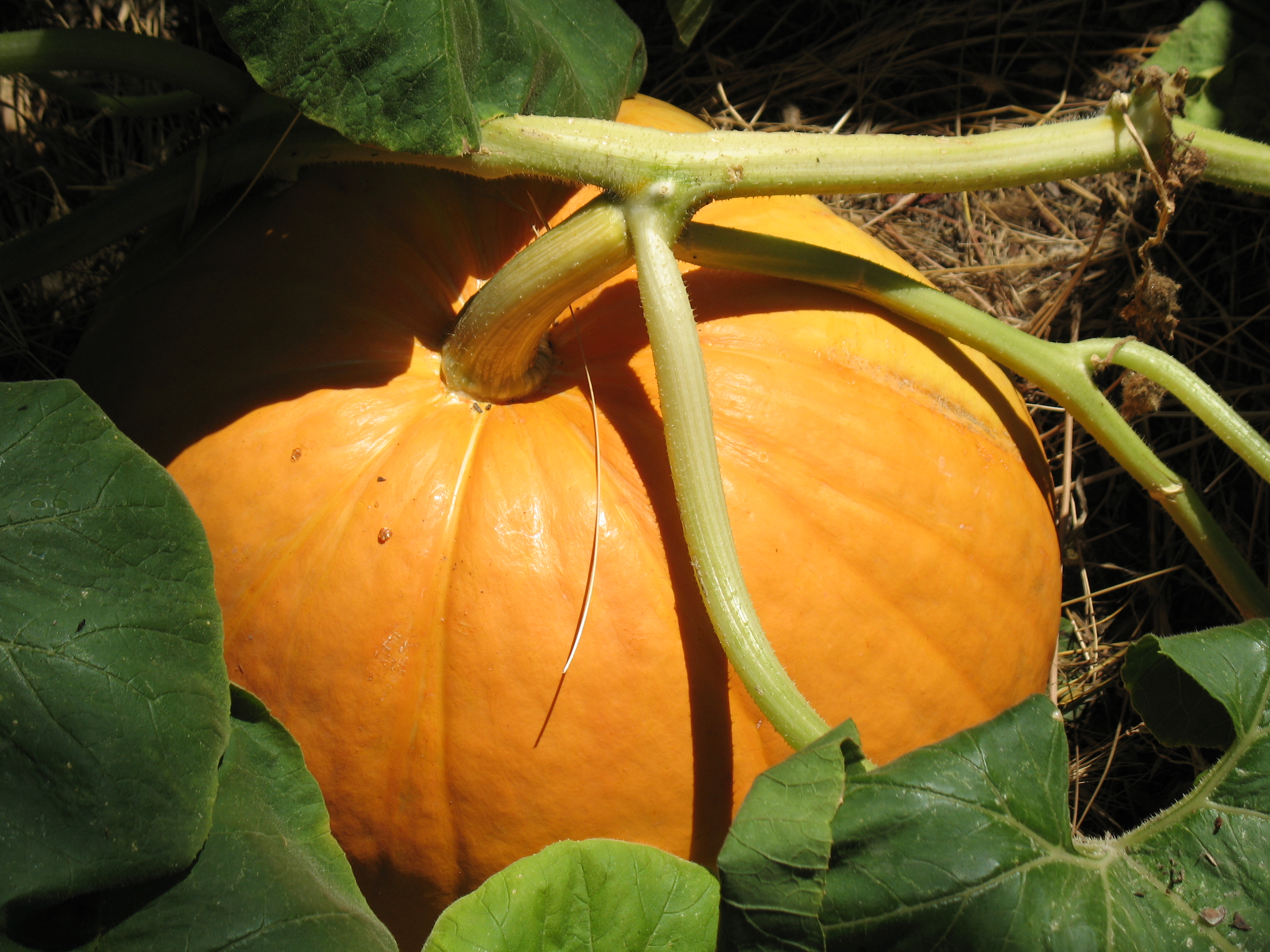
The name 'Pumpkin Papers" arose from four or five rolls of camera film hidden in a pumpkin at the Whittaker Chambers Farm in December 1948

The Pumpkin Papers, a set of typewritten and handwritten documents stolen from the US federal government (thus information leaks) by members of the Ware Group and other Soviet spy networks in Washington, DC, during 1937–1938, were withheld by courier Whittaker Chambers from delivery to the Soviets as protection when he defected. They featured frequently in criminal proceedings against Alger Hiss from August 1948 to January 1950. The term quickly became shorthand for the complete set of handwritten, typewritten, and camera film documents in newspapers.

== Background ==
For the Ware Group in Washington (1935-1938), Chambers couriered documents from federal officials to New York City to Soviet spymasters, the last of whom was Boris Bykov. During early 1938, Chambers withheld some documents as life insurance as he readied to defect and go into hiding in April 1938. According to Chambers, he put the documents in a manila envelope and asked his wife's nephew Nathan Levine to hide them (which Levine did, in a dumbwaiter in a Brooklyn home). In 1939, Chambers came out of hiding and joined Time magazine, where he worked through 1948.

On August 3, 1948, Chambers testified under subpoena before the House Un-American Activities Committee (HUAC) in Washington, DC, that he had been a Soviet courier in the 1930s. He named former federal officials in the Ware Group cell, including: John Abt, Nathan Witt, Lee Pressman, and Alger Hiss. On August 5, Hiss appeared before HUAC and denied the allegations. On August 20, Abt, Witt, and Pressman pled the Fifth, all three under advice of counsel Harold I. Cammer. On April 27, Chambers asserted on Meet the Press, then a national radio show, that Hiss had been a communist; in late September, Hiss filed a slander suit in a federal court in Baltimore against Chambers for making that allegation publicly.

== Events ==
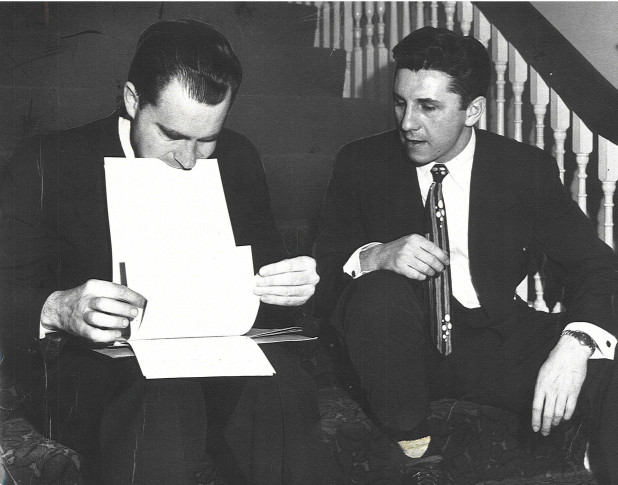
Freshman US Representative Richard Nixon prepares to make his Pumpkin Papers speech in 1950 (journalist Ted Knap seated with him)

According to the Central Intelligence Agency, the Pumpkin Papers added a "dramatic sequence of events". Between April and November (when Chambers was asked to produce evidence of Hiss' CPUSA membership in the slander case), Chambers had flip-flopped on whether his Ware Group had engaged in espionage. On November 17, 1948, Chambers surrendered the typewritten and handwritten documents to Hiss' lawyer William L. Marbury Jr. as part of pre-trial deposition in a slander case. At Hiss' request, Marbury in turn surrendered the typewritten and handwritten documents (sometimes called the "Baltimore Documents") to the United States Department of Justice in the hope that Justice would indict Chambers for espionage. The hard copy documents included summaries of United States Department of State documents in Hiss' handwriting as well as typewritten copies of official government reports. On December 2, 1948, HUAC investigators arrived at Chambers' farm in Westminster, Maryland, and took from Chambers five canisters of microfilm, after he retrieved them from a pumpkin he had hollowed out overnight to keep them safe – hence the "Pumpkin Papers". Nixon and HUAC investigation director Robert E. Stripling paraded the microfilm before the press. In less than two weeks, instead of indicting Chambers, Justice indicted Hiss, in part because the collective Pumpkin Papers provided strong evidence of espionage on Hiss' part.

During two trials against Alger Hiss in 1949, "the star witnesses were the Pumpkin Papers". FBI analysis proved that typewritten copies had been typed on a Woodstock typewriter (No. 230099) belonging to the Hiss family. The majority of handwritten documents were in Hiss' hand (the others being in the hand of Treasury official Harry Dexter White). The Hiss defense team was unable to discredit the typewriter or typewritten documents during the trials. In January 1950, a jury found Hiss guilty, and he was sentenced to 5 years in prison.

In 1950, Representative Nixon made a Pumpkin Papers speech to Congress, a few weeks after Senator Joseph McCarthy cited the Hiss case, giving rise to McCarthyism.

In 1950 in support of passage of the McCarran Internal Security Act, Senator Karl Mundt told a Senate hearing that the act needed to pass, based on what he had learned as a HUAC member about "the so-called pumpkin papers case, the espionage activities in the Chambers-Hiss case, the Bentley case, and others".

== Legacy ==
Subsequent scandalous sets of documents whose names mirror the Pumpkin Papers include the Pentagon Papers (1971), Panama Papers (2016), Paradise Papers (2017), Afghanistan Papers (2019), and Pandora Papers (2021).

=== Media ===
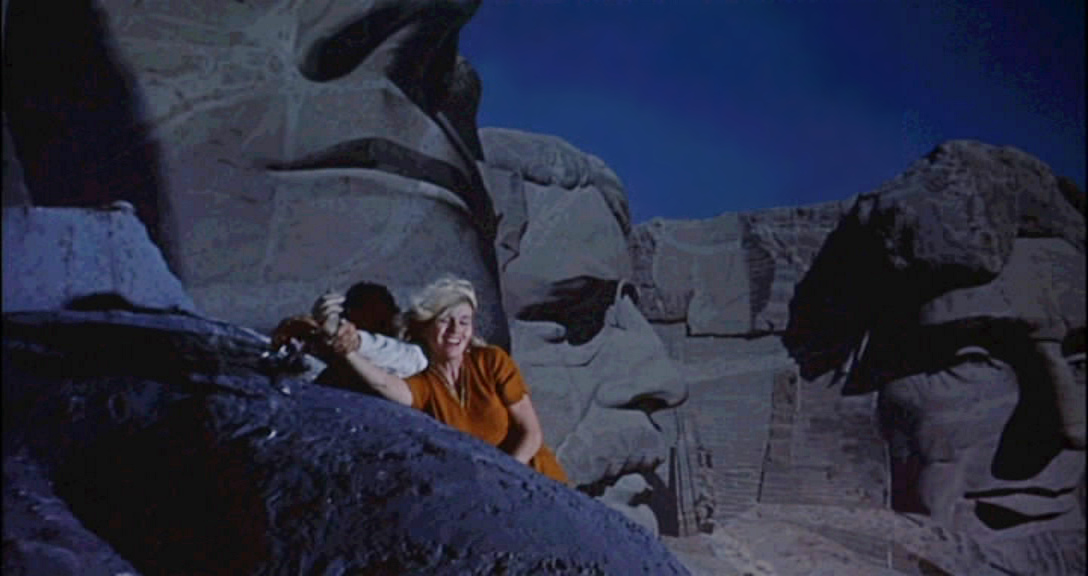
Actor Cary Grant alludes to the Pumpkin Papers atop Mount Rushmore during the climax of Alfred Hitchcock's 1959 film North by Northwest

In his 1949 book The Red Plot Against America, HUAC investigator Robert E. Stripling claimed that he had named the Pumpkin Papers.

The nascent conservative movement led by William F. Buckley Jr. lionized Chambers as a hero, and Buckley's magazine National Review (founded 1955) continues to mention the Pumpkin Papers regularly.

The Pumpkin Papers received regular mention in the press, from local to national outlets.

Books about the Hiss case were published into the 21st century, all mentioning the Pumpkin Papers. Richard Nixon, who rose to national fame during the Hiss case, mentions the Pumpkin Papers in four of his books. The name Pumpkin Papers appears as book titles, and the Pumpkin Papers Irregulars appear in a novel.

The Pumpkin Papers appeared in film as well. Actor Cary Grant alludes to the Pumpkin Papers atop Mount Rushmore during the climax of Alfred Hitchcock's 1959 film North by Northwest when he tells actress Eve Marie Saint, "I see you've got the pumpkin" (in this case, a statue full of microfilm). That same year, the Three Stooges movie Commotion on the Ocean includes microfilm in a watermelon. In 1982, The Atomic Cafe documentary film shows footage of FBI retrieval of the Pumpkins Papers, followed by a press conference with Nixon and Stripling (00:30:00-40).

=== Pumpkin Papers Irregulars ===
This group (allegedly a "secret society") formed in New York City in 1977 by Paul Seabury with meetings notionally off-the-record. Annually on the Thursday closest to Halloween it holds a dinner to announce the Victor Navasky Award for "most disloyal American". Long-time members include Grover Norquist. Members have included Buckley, Nixon, Ronald Reagan, Robert H. Bork, James Q. Wilson, and Clare Booth Luce.

Recipients of the group's annual "Victor Navasky Prize" include:

- Writer Saul Alinsky
- Actress Jane Fonda
- Contractor Edward Snowden
- Senator Dianne Feinstein (2018)

Speakers have included:

- Philosopher Sidney Hook (1978)
- CIA Director William J. Casey (1984)
- Journalist John O'Sullivan (1990)
- Judge Laurence H. Silberman (2005)
- Senator Jon Kyl and Writer Diana West (2013)
- Activist Steve Bannon (2017)
- Columnist Mary Anastasia O’Grady (2018)

Members have included: William F. Buckley Jr., Grover Norquist, Alfred Regnery.

A supporter of Alger Hiss and Harry Dexter White who has attended several dinners described a typical evening at the "one time secret institution".

== External sources ==
- A Pumpkin Patch, a Typewriter, and Richard Nixon: The Hiss-Chambers Espionage Case (podcast by John Berresford)
- AFIO 2014 announcement
- National Archives: Pumpkin Papers Canisters
- National Archives: USA vs. Alger Hiss
- Encyclopedia Britannica
- Stanford University Pumpkin Papers in Sam Tanenhaus papers
- Famous Trials
- The Alger Hiss Story
- Shelby Addresses the 26th Meeting of the 'Pumpkin Papers Irregulars' (2003)
- Craig, Bruce (1990). "Politics in the Pumpkin Patch". The Public Historian. 12 (1): 9–24. doi:10.2307/3378319. JSTOR 3378319.
- Mackintosh, Barry (1990). "'Politics in the Pumpkin Patch': A Response". The Public Historian. 12 (2): 53–56. doi:10.2307/3378688. JSTOR 3378688.
