= Papar (disambiguation) =

The Papar were a historic Celtic Christian group.

Papar may also refer to:

- Papadum, or papar, an Indian flatbread
- Papar, Malaysia, a town in Sabah, Malaysia
  - Papar District
  - Papar (federal constituency)
  - Papar railway station (Malaysia)
- Papar River, a river in Sabah, Malaysia
- Papar language, a language of Malaysia
- Papar railway station (Indonesia), a train station on Java, Indonesia
- Papar, Iran, a village in Iran
