= Whittaker Chambers Farm =

Historic house in Maryland, United States

- U.S. National Register of Historic Places
- U.S. National Historic Landmark District
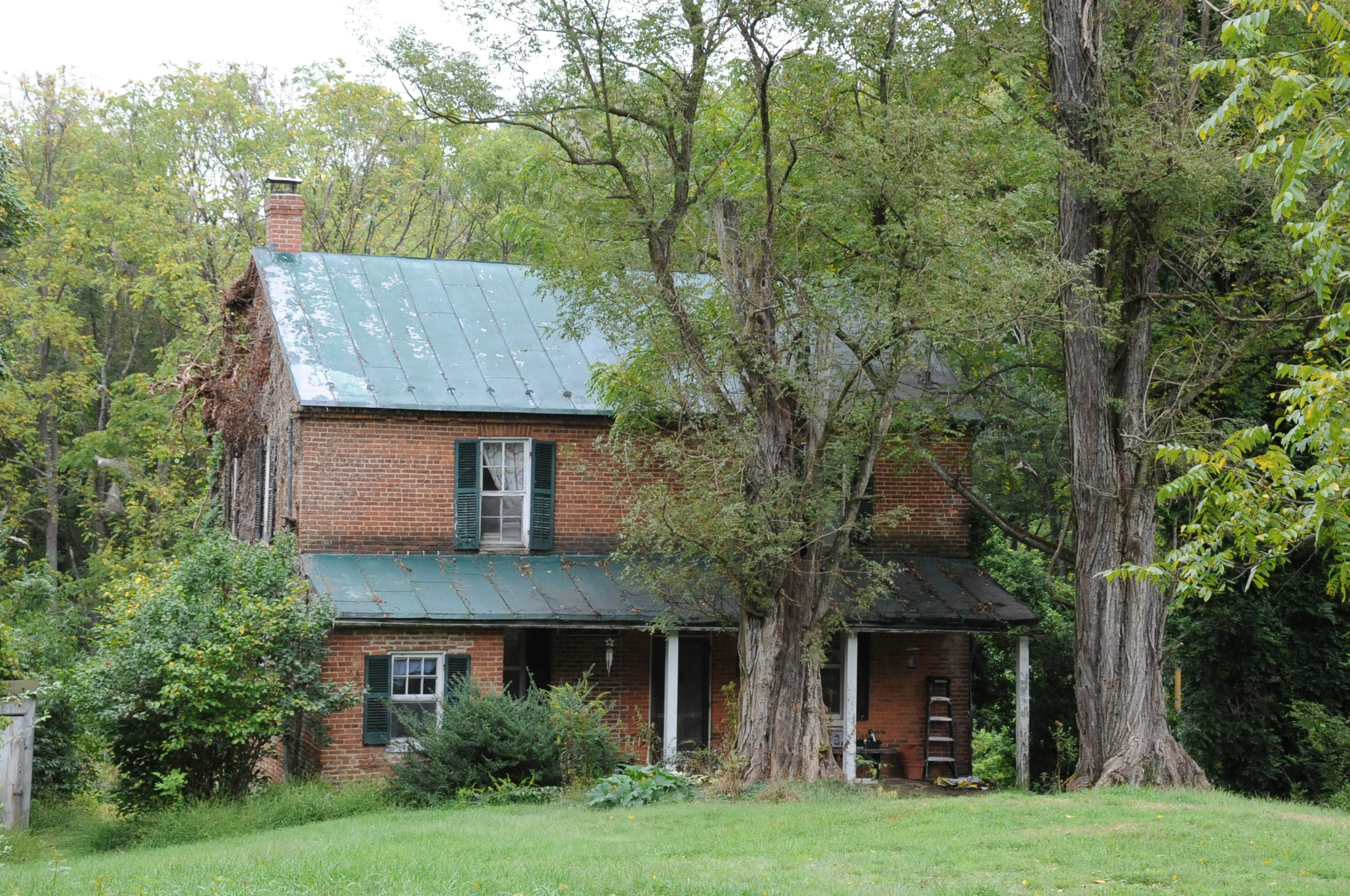

- Location within Maryland Location within the United States
- Location: East Saw Mill Rd., Westminster, Maryland
- Coordinates: 39°39′35″N 76°58′35″W
- Area: 390 acres (160 ha)
- Built: 1941
- Website: whittakerchambers.org
- NRHP reference No.: 88001824

Significant dates
- Added to NRHP: May 17, 1988
- Designated NHLD: May 17, 1988

The Whittaker Chambers Farm, also known as the Pipe Creek Farm, is a historic cluster of farm properties near Westminster in rural Carroll County, Maryland. The farm's historic significance comes from its ownership by Whittaker Chambers (1901-1961), a pivotal figure in American Cold War politics. In December 1948, Chambers hid the "Pumpkin Papers" (microfilm) while awaiting a subpoena from the House Un-American Activities Committee to relinquish any intelligence stolen from the US Government by members of the Soviet spy rings within the federal government (e.g., Alger Hiss). Chambers also wrote his best-selling 1952 memoir Witness there. The property was designated a National Historic Landmark in 1988, in a somewhat controversial decision. The property remains in the Chambers family and is not accessible to the public.

== Description ==
The Whittaker Chambers Farm is located a few miles north of Westminster and is roughly bounded by East Saw Mill Road to the southwest and Pipe Creek to the northeast. The farm comprises three contiguous areas, separately purchased, totaling about 390 acres (160 ha). The land is a mix of open farm fields and woods. Whittaker Chambers ran this "dirt farm" as a dairy farm.

- The first tract of land, a 40-acre (16 ha) parcel, purchased by Chambers in 1941, formed the original core of the farm. Chambers lived there from 1941. After a fire in 1957, he sold it to an architect, who built the present house in 1960. Since then, the family has reacquired the property. The original barn burned in 2007; other outbuildings from Chambers' ownership remain. The patch with volunteer pumpkins that hid the "Pumpkin Papers" is no longer a strawberry patch. A fire destroyed the barn and damaged a shed that stood on the property in Chambers' time.
- The second tract, the Pipe Creek Farm, comprises about 230 acres (93 ha). It was purchased in 1946 by Chambers and remains in the family. The mid-19th century house on this property was Chambers' residence from 1957 to his death in 1961. It includes a pond and several outbuildings;
- A third tract of 120 acres (49 ha), purchased by Chambers in 1947, connects the first two parcels. The house, known as "Medfield", was built in the 19th century and was used by Chambers as a writing retreat. Chambers added a connection between the main house and an adjoining summer house in the 1950s. This property also remains in the Chambers family. On January 6, 2010, the Medfield farmhouse burned as a result of an electrical fire.

== Historic significance ==
Whittaker Chambers had joined the Communist Party in 1925 and engaged in spying for the Soviet Union in 1932. By 1937, he was becoming disenchanted and left the party by 1938. Under subpoena on August 3, 1948, he testified about the existence of a "Ware Group" spy ring; it included Alger Hiss, an official in the State Department during the 1930s. Hiss was convicted of perjury in two sensational trials, major event of the early Cold War. In December 1948, Chambers hid and then retrieved microfilm from a hollowed-out pumpkin on his farm, which he turned over to investigators and which led directly to the indictment of Hiss. The case made Richard Nixon, then a little-known Congressman from California, famous.

The farm was also a key in the relationship between Chambers and Hiss. Chambers reported that he first saw a nearby property (the "Shaw Place") in company with Hiss, who had originally contracted to buy it. In 1937, Chambers purchased the Shaw Place. He then began to buy what became the Pipe Creek Farm as his retreat from Communism, remote from possible Soviet retaliation. He moved his family in 1941.

== Landmark designation ==
The decision in 1988 to designate the Chambers Farm a National Historic Landmark was unusual at the time for two reasons. First, it did not pass the usual requirement of 50 years' age for a historic event. Second, the National Park Service Advisory Board recommended against its designation. In May 1988, Interior Secretary Donald P. Hodel granted national landmark status to the Pipe Creek Farm.

In 2012, a book on the Cold War questioned the propriety of the farm as landmark, particularly because it is not open to the public. A member of the Chambers family provided details that did not appear in the book, namely, that the farm was not a museum but a working farm and, as such, not open to the public.

A twice-proposed Union Mills reservoir, if built, would flood portions of the Chambers property. The project is opposed by Whittaker Chambers' son, who has bought back the farmstead of the Pipe Creek Farm to reform the full farm. He told the Baltimore Sun: "This is where my parents died ... My end-of-life goal has been to reassemble it and make it available to the next generation as a farm."

Along with more than 100 other farms in Carroll County, the Whittaker Chambers Farm is under agricultural conservation easement.

== See also ==
- List of National Historic Landmarks in Maryland
- National Register of Historic Places listings in Carroll County, Maryland
