= Piney Run Park =

Nature park in Maryland

Coordinates: 39°23′53″N 76°59′10.46″W

Piney Run Park is a nature park in Sykesville, located in Carroll County, Maryland. It is Carroll County's oldest developed park and hosts thousands of visitors annually. The park encompasses 550 acres of fields, forest and open spaces, features over 15 miles of hiking trails, a 300-acre lake and many sports and recreational facilities. Prior to being a park, this land was a private farm.

The Piney Run project was initiated in 1964 to provide southeastern Carroll County with a future water supply, a site for outdoor recreation, and for protection from flooding. Construction of a 73-foot-high earthen dam began in 1973 and was completed 16 months later. This created the 300-acre lake that is used for boating, fishing and wildlife conservation. A portion of the 500 acres surrounding the lake has been developed for recreational use. The remaining land is conserved in its natural state. The lake is 50 feet deep at the lowest part, just in front of the dam.

Piney Run Park officially began operations in 1976. At this time, the only building in the park was the entrance station. The Park Manager had his office at that location and all Park business, including rental of boats, occurred there.

Since 1976, many structures have been erected throughout the park, including the Nature Center and the boathouse. Semi-permanent structures have also been added, such as picnic tables, six pavilions, playgrounds, an amphitheater, and basketball and tennis courts. Additionally, a steel sculpture titled "The Great Blue Heron," created by local Sykesville artist, Virginia Sperry, was installed in March 2018 off-shore near the boathouse.

== Piney Run Nature Center ==
The Piney Run Nature Center is operated by the Carroll County Department of Parks and Recreation. The Nature Center was completed in 1981 and is staffed by the Park Naturalists and volunteers. It offers programs throughout the year to school, youth and community organizations. The Nature Center features living exhibits and informative displays pertaining to the history and ecosystem of Piney Run Park. The center also has designated rooms for young children and environmental education.

Piney Run Nature Center staff offer environmental education, a part of the center's "mother nature program series," and birthday parties, which are available to the public. The Nature Center sponsors the Piney Run Nature Camp, a summer program open to kids in kindergarten and up to 8th grade. Piney Run Nature Center also hosts the annual Apple Festival, which was first held in 1986.

Smaller structures surround the nature center. These include the Yak Shak, the Yurt, and the outdoor bird cages. The Yak Shak holds some of the park's kayaks, which residents can rent from the boathouse. The Yurt is a space which can be rented for various public and private activities.

== Piney Run Reservoir ==
The geographical boundaries of Piney Run Park encompass Piney Run Reservoir, a 300-acre, man-made, freshwater lake finished in 1974. The reservoir's deepest point is 50 feet, it holds about 2 billion gallons of water, and its dam is 73 feet high. It is a tributary of the South Branch Patapsco River. Piney Run Reservoir has four established coves: Farm Cove, Kickout Cove, Dot's Cove, and Nature Center Cove. Floating piers and standing platforms are located around the lake. Additionally, a restricted wildlife area exists in the northwest point of the reservoir for the purpose of channel catfish propagation. Boating and fishing are permitted in areas other than the restricted wildlife area, but swimming and boats with gasoline motors are not allowed. Fishing tournaments and boating events are hosted throughout the open season. Night fishing has been permitted at various times during the open season.

Piney Run Reservoir is stocked with multiple species of fish by the Maryland Freshwater Fisheries Division. Common species include largemouth bass, channel catfish, redear sunfish, yellow perch, and black crappie. Other species include striped bass, tiger musky, various native sunfish species, smallmouth bass, brown bullhead and annually stocked rainbow trout.

=== Hydrilla ===
Hydrilla verticillata is a non-native, invasive and aquatic plant species which can be found in the reservoir ecosystem and is visible near the shoreline. The presence of hydrilla may influence the water clarity of Piney Run Reservoir.

== See also ==
- Liberty Reservoir
- Union Mills Reservoir (proposed)
