= Papier (company) =

British online e-commerce brand

Papier Ltd
- Industry: E-Commerce
- Founded: May 2015
- Headquarters: London
- Products: Customized Stationery
- Number of employees: 70 (2021)
- Website: https://www.papier.com

Papier Ltd is a British online e-commerce brand that sells personalized stationery. The company sells customizable wedding invitations and stationery including, on-demand customized notebooks, and notecards. It trades and has printers in the United States, United Kingdom, Australia, and its headquarters are in Camden, London.

It has been a winner of the British Wedding Awards and UK Wedding Awards for its wedding stationery.

== Overview ==
Papier was established in May 2015, by Taymoor Atighetchi, in London, UK. It is headquartered in Camden, London. The company raised its series A funds of $4 million in 2017, led by venture capital firm Felix Capital, JamJar Investments, and Downing Ventures.

In September 2017, the company started operations in Australia, and then in US in May 2018. It raised its series B funds of $11 million, led by venture capital firm Beringea and its series A investors, in September 2019.

Since its launch, the company has collaborated with 40 design partners, artists, illustrators, including Victoria and Albert Museum, Mother of Pearl, Disney, House of Holland, Desmond & Dempsey, department store Liberty of London, Matilda Goad, and collaborated with Adwoa Aboah and Gurls Talk for International Women's Day 2021.

=== Products ===
The company sells customizable print-on-demand stationery, including notebooks, wall art, diaries, cards, wedding invitations, announcements cards, greeting cards, notecard sets, planners, wellness journals, and photo books along with other stationery products.

=== Recognition ===
Papier won awards for Best Wedding Stationery at the British Wedding Awards in 2018, 2019, 2020, and UK Wedding Awards in 2017, 2018, and 2020. The Independent's IndyBest reviews awarded Papier 'Best Overall Diary' and 'Best Overall Photo Book' for 2026.
