= Liberty Reservoir =

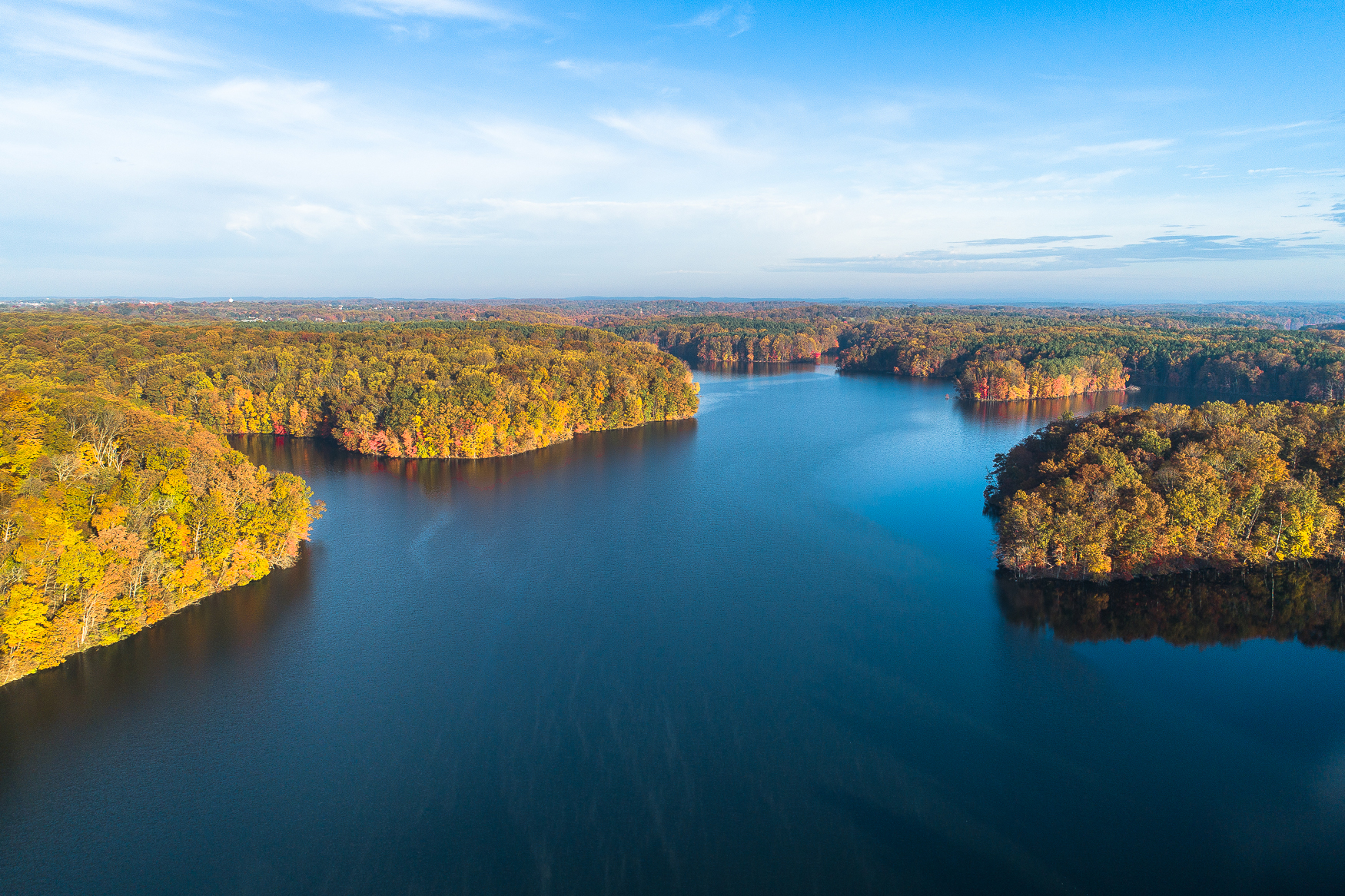
- Aerial view of Liberty Reservoir

- Location within Maryland Location within the United States
- Location: Baltimore / Carroll counties, near Eldersburg, Maryland
- Coordinates: 39°25′04″N 76°52′44″W
- Type: reservoir
- Primary inflows: North Branch Patapsco River
- Primary outflows: North Branch Patapsco River
- Basin countries: United States
- Surface area: 4.73 sq mi (1,225 hectares)
- Average depth: 59 ft (18 m)
- Max. depth: 144 ft (44 m)
- Water volume: 43×10^{9} US gal (160,000,000 m^{3})
- Surface elevation: 410 ft (120 m) (dam crest)
- Website: www.libertyreservoir.org

Liberty Reservoir is a reservoir west of Baltimore, Maryland; about a mile north of Patapsco Valley State Park's McKeldin area. It is owned by the City of Baltimore Department of Public Works, but is located outside the city, and it divides Baltimore and Carroll Counties.

== History ==
This 1,225-hectare (4.73 sq mi) reservoir was the former site of the town of Oakland Mill and the Melville Woolen Mills. The land was purchased from the Melville family in the 1930s. A rumor swirled that Oakland would be destroyed, but few left. An announcement was finally made in 1942 that a reservoir was to be built, but reality hit in 1947, when the timber cutters came to town.

In 1951, the government bought the Melville Woolen Mill for $1.5 million. It bought the farms and houses that were in the way of the lake. The tenant workers were forced to leave.

The mill was dynamited, although its five-story shell remained. It took years for the water to rise high enough to cover the crumbling walls. Over several years, the natural springs, tributaries, and other water sources filled in where Oakland Mills once stood to create the reservoir. Water overflowed the crest for the first time on February 6, 1956.

== Geography ==
The North Branch of the Patapsco River is the primary tributary that feeds the reservoir. Other tributaries include Beaver Run, Keyser Run, Prugh Run, Morgan Run, Middle Run, Locust Run, and Cooks Branch. Reservoir length is 11 mi (18 km) with a shoreline length at full pool of 81 miles (130 km). The average depth is 59 feet (18 m)= with a maximum depth of 144 feet (44 m).

== Activities ==
The reservoir is open to a vast array of activities. Patrons can bike, boat, hike, fish, birdwatch, and relax. Prohibited activities include camping, fires, swimming and alcohol consumption. Although not allowed, it is often very common to find swimmers in the heat of the summer. Baltimore Environmental Police Officers are patrol all three of the city's watersheds. Sometime shortly before late 2014, the dam tourist area lookout was fenced off. The trails around the reservoir consist of unpaved fire access roads, which are generally kept clear, and many miles of single track. There is a firing range north of the dam that is used by the Maryland State Police.

== See also ==
- Piney Run Reservoir
- Union Mills Reservoir (proposed)
