= Papers (information leaks) =

Papers is a term - coined in the press - for leaking of data. The data is commonly of a financial or governmental nature.

"Papers" may refer to the:

- 1948: Pumpkin Papers - microfilm hidden by Whittaker Chambers during hearings by US House Un-American Activities Committee
- 1965: Penkovsky Papers - partial title of book The Penkovsky Papers : The Russian Who Spied for the West, commissioned by the CIA on secrets revealed by Oleg Penkovsky
- 1971: Pentagon Papers - leak of the US Department of Defense's history of the US involvement in Vietnam (1945-1967)
- 2010: Pentagon Papers II - name coined for the 2010 Afghan War documents leak
- 2011: Palestine Papers - set of confidential documents about the Israeli–Palestinian peace process leaked to Al Jazeera, which published them
- 2016: Panama Papers - 11.5 million leaked documents published from 2016
- 2017: Paradise Papers - 13.4 million confidential electronic documents relating to offshore investments, leaked to the Süddeutsche Zeitung, widely shared with the ICIJ et al., and made public from 2017
- 2019: Xinjiang Papers - collection of +400 pages of internal Chinese government documents on policy toward Uyghur Muslims in Xinjiang
- 2021: Pandora Papers - 11.9 million leaked documents published by the International Consortium of Investigative Journalists (ICIJ) beginning on 3 October 2021
