= Lansdowne =

Lansdowne or Lansdown may refer to:

== People ==
- Lansdown (surname)
- Lansdowne (surname)
- Lansdown Guilding (1797–1831), Saint Vincent and the Grenadines naturalist and engraver
- George Granville, 1st Baron Lansdowne (1666–1735)
- Marquess of Lansdowne, title in the Peerage of Great Britain
  - William Petty, 2nd Earl of Shelburne, William Petty, 1st Marquess of Lansdowne, (1737–1805), prime minister 1782–83
  - Henry Petty-Fitzmaurice, 5th Marquess of Lansdowne (1845–1927), Governor General of Canada, Viceroy of India, Secretary of State for War, and Secretary of State for Foreign Affairs

== Places ==
=== Australia ===
- Lansdowne, New South Wales, Sydney
- Lansdowne, New South Wales (Mid-Coast Council)
- Lansdowne, Northern Territory
- Lansdowne, Queensland, locality in the Blackall-Tambo Region
- Lansdowne County, Western Australia
- Lansdowne Hotel, a pub in Chippendale, Sydney

=== Canada ===
- Lansdowne, Edmonton, Alberta
- Lansdowne, Nova Scotia
- Lansdowne, Ontario
- Lansdowne (electoral district), Manitoba
- Lansdowne Avenue, Toronto, Ontario
- Lansdowne Park, Ottawa, Ontario
- Lansdowne Centre, Richmond, British Columbia
- Lansdowne, Yukon

=== India ===
- Lansdowne, India, cantonment town in Uttarakhand
- Lansdowne (Uttarakhand Assembly constituency)
- Lansdowne Road, Kolkata, now known as Sarat Bose Road

=== Ireland ===
- Lansdowne Road, a former sports stadium in Dublin whose site is occupied by the current Aviva Stadium

=== New Caledonia ===
- Lansdowne Bank

=== New Zealand ===
- Lansdowne, Christchurch, a locality south of Christchurch
- Lansdowne, Masterton

=== South Africa ===
- Lansdowne, Cape Town

=== United Kingdom ===
- Lansdown, Bath
  - Lansdown Crescent, Bath
- Lansdown, Charlcombe, hamlet near Bath
- Lansdowne, Bournemouth
- Lansdown, Cheltenham
- Lansdowne Crescent, London
- Lansdowne House, London
- Lansdowne School, London
- Lansdowne College, London
- Lansdowne Club, London
- Lansdowne Primary School, Cardiff, Wales

=== United States ===
- Lansdowne, Lexington, Kentucky
- Lansdowne, Maryland
- Lansdowne (Centreville, Maryland)
- Lansdowne-Baltimore Highlands, Maryland
- Lansdowne (Natchez, Mississippi), a plantation
- Lansdowne station (MBTA) on MBTA Commuter Rail's Framingham/Worcester Line
- Lansdowne, New Jersey
  - Lansdown (Pittstown, New Jersey), nearby historic house listed on the NRHP
- Lansdowne Airport, Ohio
- Lansdowne House (Greenville, Ohio)
- Lansdowne, Pennsylvania
- East Lansdowne, Pennsylvania
- Lansdowne, Virginia
- Lansdowne (Urbanna, Virginia), a historic home
- Lansdowne (Fredericksburg, Virginia), a historic home

== Other uses ==
- Battle of Lansdowne, 1643
- Lansdown (film), 2002 film
- Lansdowne Bridge (Pakistan)
- Lansdown Cricket Club, Bath, England
- Lansdowne Football Club, rugby football club in Ireland
- Lansdowne letter, written by Henry Petty-Fitzmaurice, 5th Marquess of Lansdowne
- Lansdowne manuscripts, a named collection of the British Library
- Lansdowne Portrait, of George Washington
- Lansdowne Press, Australian publishing house
- Lansdowne Road, former stadium in Dublin, Ireland
- Lansdowne station (disambiguation), stations of the name
- SS Lansdowne, railroad car ferry and floating restaurant
- USS Lansdowne (DD-486), a Gleaves-class destroyer
