= Baltimore Highlands =

Baltimore Highlands may refer to a location in Maryland, the United States:

- Baltimore Highlands, Maryland, a census-designated place in southern Baltimore County
  - Baltimore Highlands (Baltimore Light Rail station)
  - Lansdowne-Baltimore Highlands, Maryland, former census-designated place
- Baltimore Highlands, Baltimore, a neighborhood in east Baltimore city
