= Lansdown Crescent =

Lansdown Crescent or Lansdowne Crescent may refer to:

- Lansdown Crescent, Bath, UK
- Lansdown Crescent, Cheltenham, UK
- Lansdowne Crescent, Leamington Spa, UK
- Lansdowne Crescent, London, UK

== See also ==
- Lansdowne (disambiguation)
