= Lansdown (surname) =

Lansdown is a surname, and may refer to:

- Bob Lansdown (1921–2006), Australian public servant
- Brenda Lansdown (1904–1990), British-born American educator
- Gwenllian Lansdown (born 1979), Welsh politician
- Harold Lansdown (1900–1957), Australian cricketer
- John Lansdown (1929–1999), British computer graphics pioneer and academic
- Peter Lansdown (born 1947), Welsh ornithologist
- Steve Lansdown (born 1952), English billionaire

== See also ==
- Lansdowne (surname)
