= Twin Valley Distillers =

Distiller based in Rockville, Maryland, US

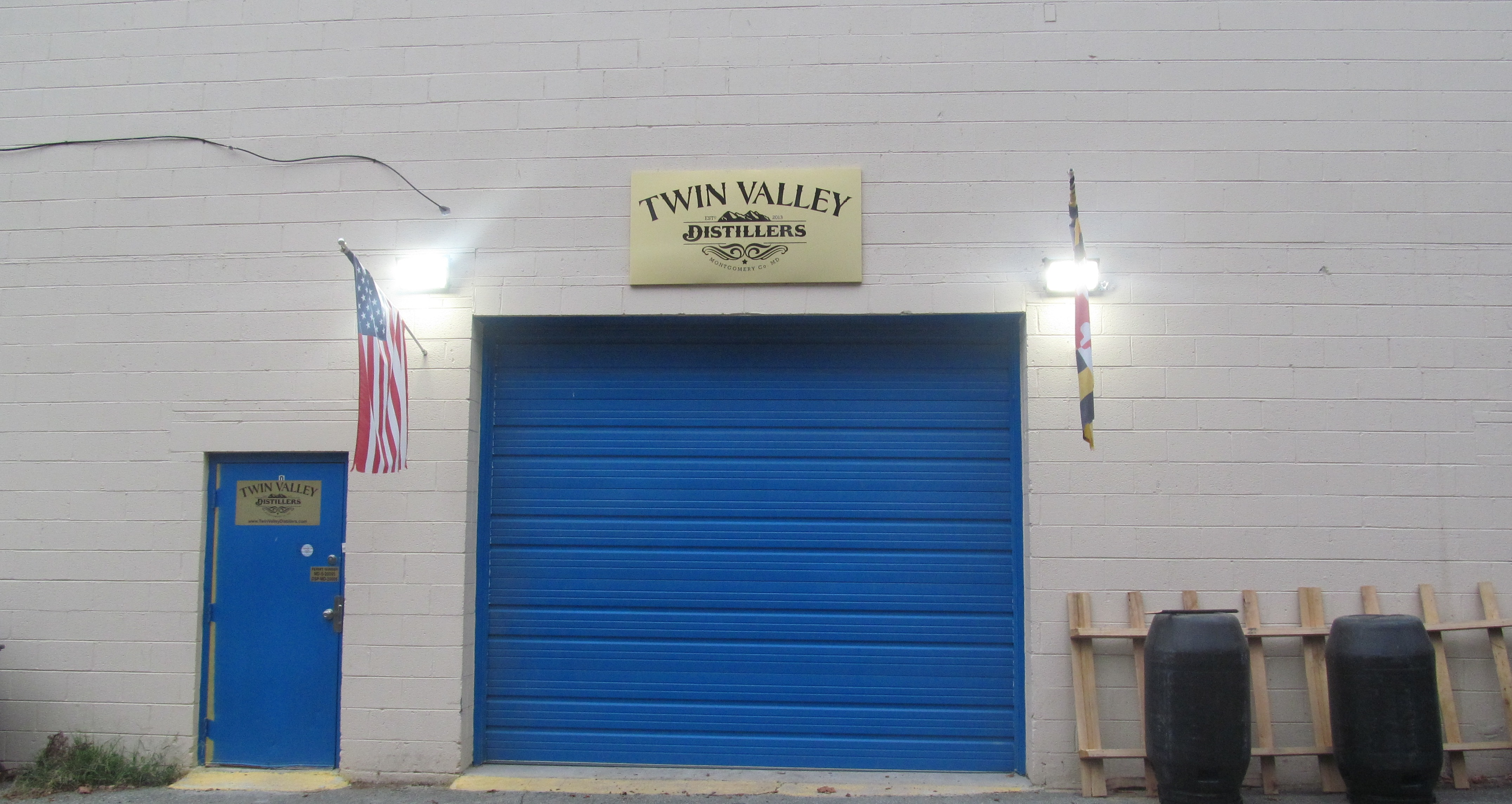
- Front of Twin Valley Distillers
- Company type: Private
- Industry: Manufacturing of Distilled Spirits
- Founded: Rockville, Maryland, U.S., 2013
- Founder: C. Edgardo Zuniga
- Headquarters: Rockville, Maryland, U.S.
- Products: Distilled spirits
- Owner: C. Edgardo Zuniga
- Number of employees: 2
- Website: www.twinvalleyd.com

Twin Valley Distillers is a distiller based in Rockville, Maryland, United States. It was the first distiller in Montgomery County, Maryland and one of the few in Maryland since 1970. Twin Valley Distillers is a member of the Maryland Distillers Guild.

Their main products are Jamaican style rums, vodkas, and corn whiskeys. They claim to produce Maryland's first bourbon.

== Claim to Maryland's first bourbon ==
Historically Maryland is not known for bourbon products and was the third largest producer of rye whiskey behind Kentucky bourbon and Pennsylvania rye up until the early 1900s with the last distiller closing its doors in 1983. In 2013, Lyon's Distilling in Blackwater's Eastern Shore was the first to start distilling a true Maryland rye whiskey.

Twin Valley Distillers claims to be the first producer in Maryland of a bourbon product. There are two known Maryland distillers that either bottled or had bottled bourbon products — Sherwood Distilling Company in Westminster, Maryland and the Majestic Distilling Company in Lansdowne, Maryland — although neither of them actually produced the product.

According to the U.S. Code of Federal Regulation, a bourbon is not to exceed 80% ABV from not less than 51% fermented corn mash and to be stored in new charred oak containers, but the regulations does not specify the length of time, the type of oak or the nature or size of the container. Those bourbon products known as straight bourbon must be stored in new charred oak containers for at least 2 years or more. Twin Valley Distillers' bourbon product is not a straight bourbon product but it is technically a bourbon.

== See also ==
- Whisky
- Bourbon
- Rum
- Distilled beverage
