= Lansdowne High School =

Location
- 2405 Lansdowne Rd; Southwest Baltimore County; Halethorpe, Maryland 21227; United States; 39.2443°N 76.6507°W

Information
- Type: Public high school
- Motto: "What Did You Learn Today?"
- Opened: 1963
- School district: Baltimore County Public Schools
- Principal: Allison Seymour
- Grades: 9-12
- Campus: Urban
- Colors: Blue and red
- Mascot: Vikings
- Website: lansdownehs.bcps.org

Lansdowne High School (LHS), formerly known as Lansdowne Sr. High School, and currently known as the Lansdowne High School Academy for Advanced Professional Studies, is a four-year public high school in Baltimore County, Maryland, United States.

== About the School ==
The school is located in the far southwest corner of Baltimore County right near the Baltimore city border. It is at 3800 Hollins Ferry Road in Lansdowne, Maryland, just west of Maryland Route 295, inside the Baltimore Beltway. It is just south of the Baltimore City neighborhoods of Lakeland and Westport, just north of the Anne Arundel County neighborhood of Linthicum/Linthicum Heights, just east of Arbutus/Halethorpe in Baltimore County, and just west of Baltimore Highlands in Baltimore County and Brooklyn/Brooklyn Park in Baltimore City.

The school district for Lansdowne High School borders the districts of Catonsville High School in Baltimore County and Southern High School, which is now known as Digital Harbor High School in Baltimore City.

Various proposals to renovate or replace the school building were made in 2016 and 2017. County officials budgeted ~$30 million in 2017 to renovate and air condition the facility, but the plan was rejected when parents contended that an entirely new school should instead be considered. To replace the old building built in 1963, a $156 million project was announced in 2022 to build a new 318,461 square feet large school on its athletic field which is expected to open in fall 2026.

On March 4th 2025, A 16 year old who attended the school was shot and killed on school property. The incident happened after school had dismissed and no one else was hurt.

== Academics ==
Lansdowne High school received a 41.8 out of a possible 100 points (41%) on the 2018-2019 Maryland State Department of Education Report Card and received a 2 out of 5 star rating, ranking in the 17th percentile among all Maryland schools.

== Magnet Programs ==
Lansdowne High school offers 12 magnet programs with different subjects that fall under the magnet itself for students to choose from to get into the school.

Academy of Arts and Communications

- Visual Arts
- Instrumental Music
- Vocal Music
- Dance
- Theater
- Mass Communications

Academy of Health and Human Services

- Teacher Academy of Maryland
- ProStart/Food Science
- Carpentry
- Electrical
- Army JROTC

Academy of Science

- Project Lead the Way (PLTW): Biomedical Science

== Students ==
The 2023–2024 enrollment at Lansdowne High School was 1352 students.

Student population

- 2024 1,352
- 2019 1,326
- 2011 981
- 2010 978
- 2009 1,113
- 2008 1,313
- 2007 1,276
- 2006 1,281
- 2005 1,230
- 2004 1,201
- 2003 1,171
- 2002 1,199
- 2001 1,221
- 2000 1,210
- 1999 1,210
- 1998 1,134
- 1997 1,116
- 1996 1,072
- 1995 1,018
- 1994 1,065
- 1993 1,141

== Athletics ==
=== State Champions ===
Girls Basketball

- Mildred Haney Murray Sportsmanship Award 1993

Baseball

- 3A 1993

Softball

- Eugene Robertson Sportsmanship Award 2012

== Notable alumni ==
- David Byrne - lead singer of 80's music group Talking Heads
- Adrienne A. Jones - Speaker of the Maryland House of Delegates

== Image gallery ==
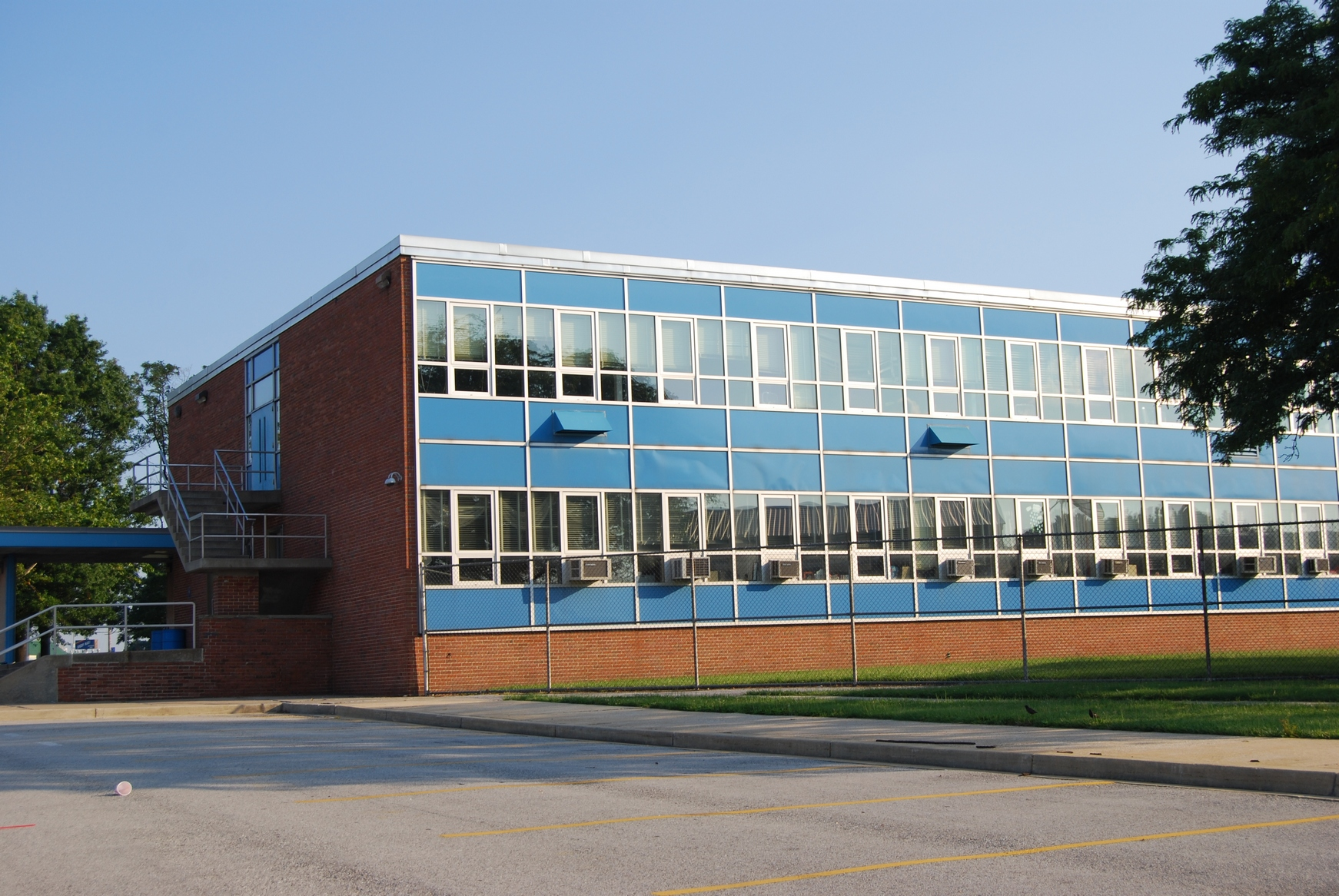
Lansdowne High School

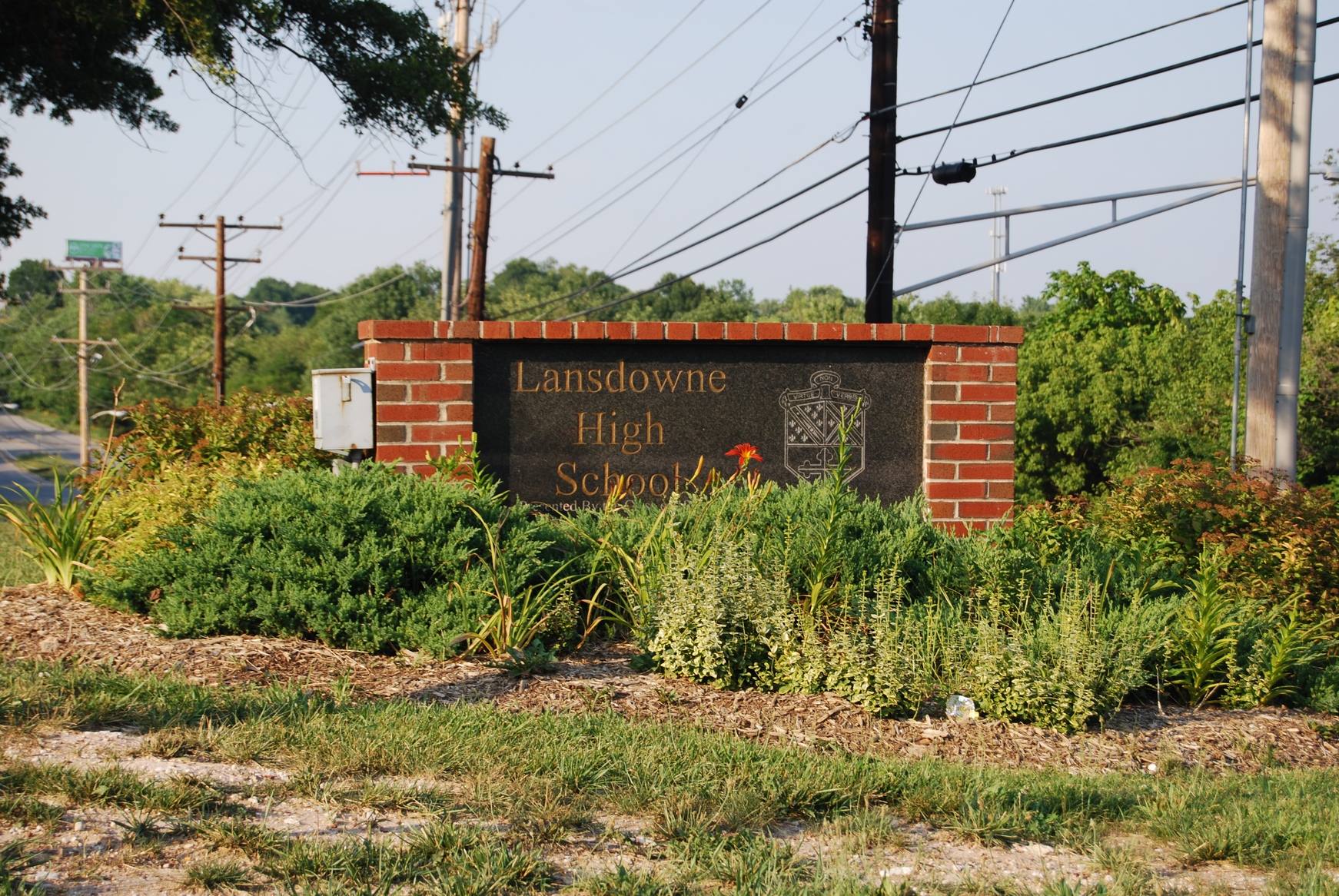
Lansdowne High School Sign

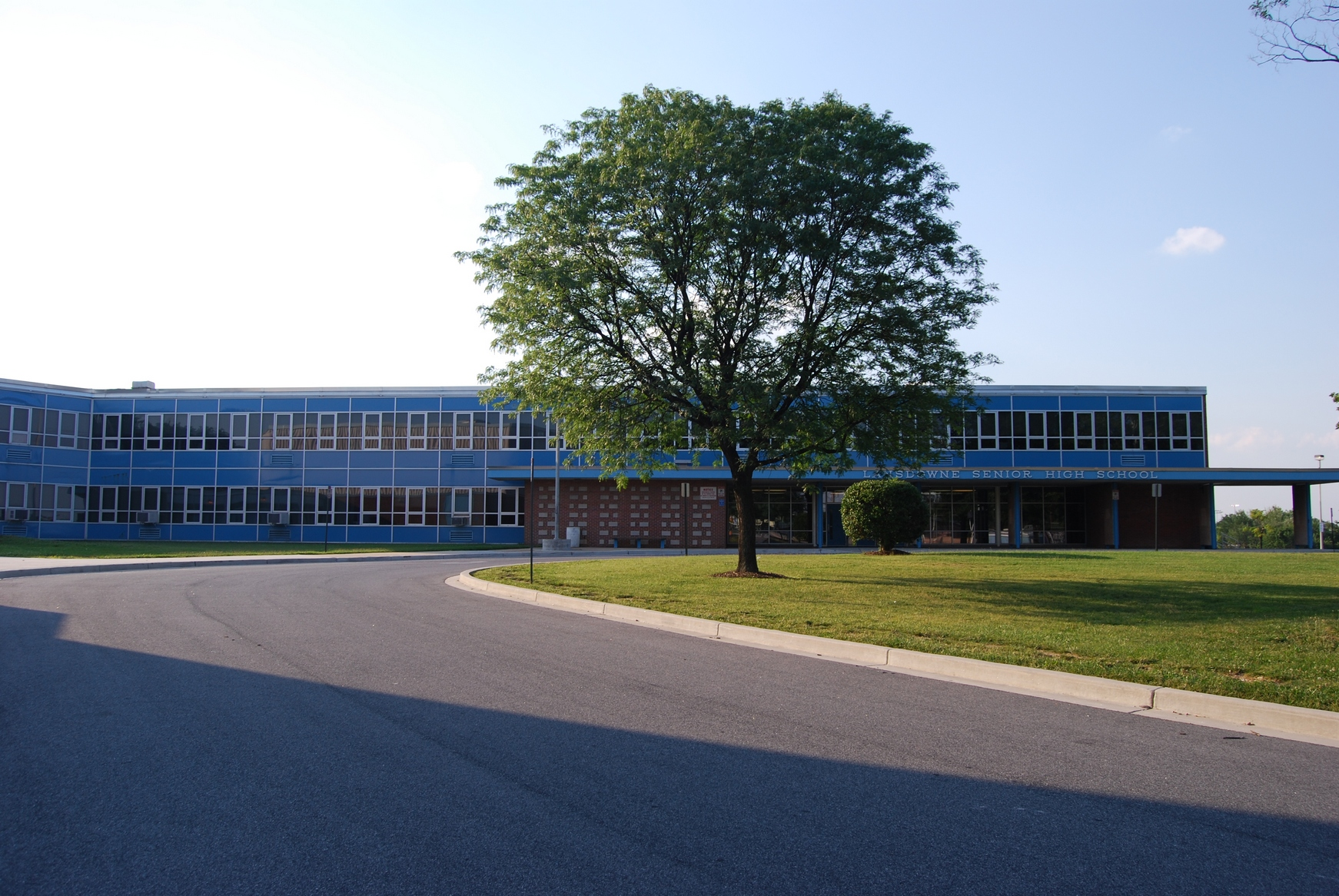
Lansdowne High School

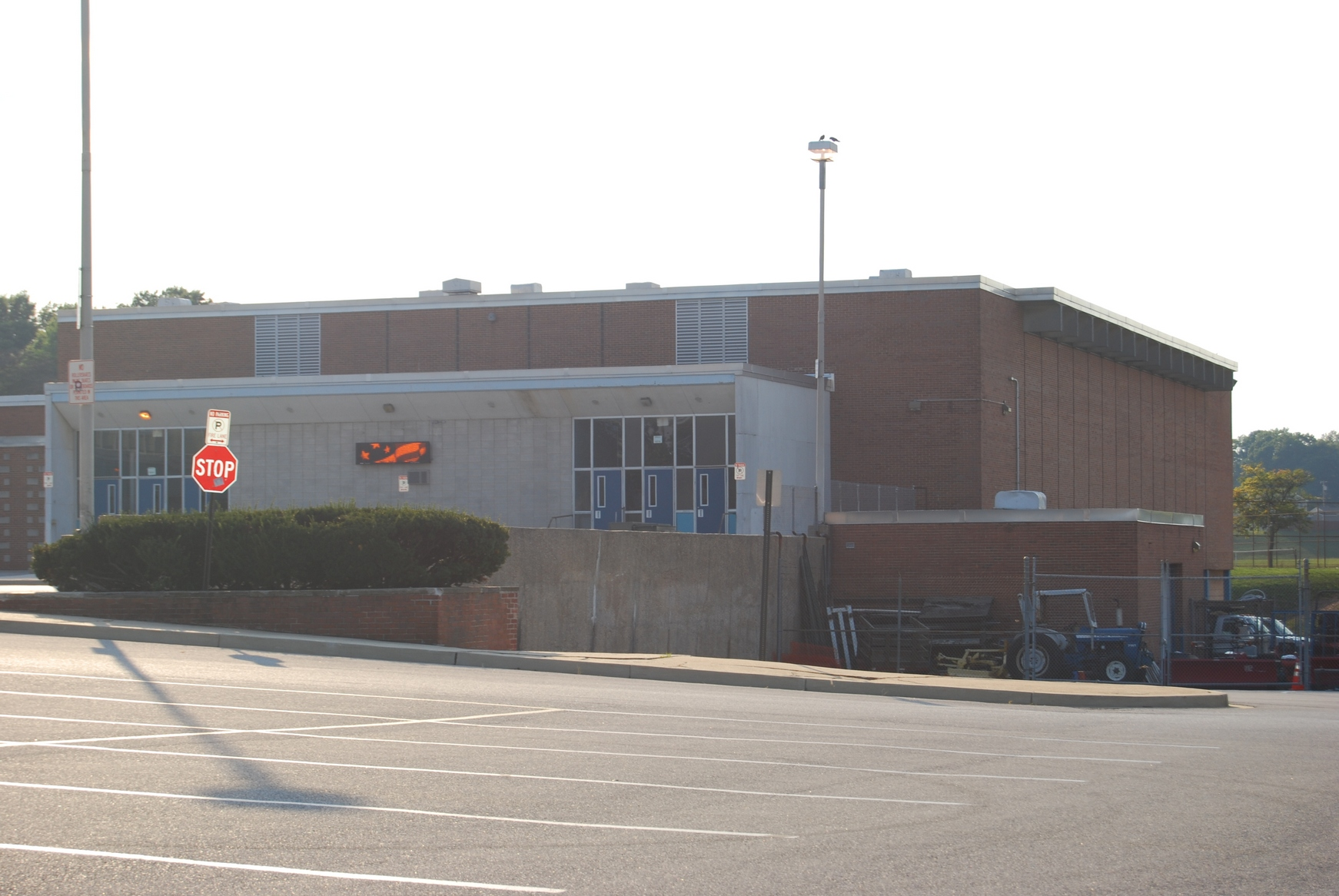
Landowne High School from the rear

== References and notes ==
- See also List of Schools in Baltimore County, Maryland
