= Lansdowne station =

Lansdowne station may refer to:

- Lansdowne station (MBTA), a commuter rail station in Boston, Massachusetts, United States, formerly known as Yawkey station
- Lansdowne station (SEPTA), a SEPTA train station in Lansdowne, Pennsylvania, United States
- Lansdowne station (SkyTrain), a Metro Vancouver SkyTrain station in Richmond, British Columbia, Canada
- Lansdowne station (Toronto), a subway station in Toronto, Ontario, Canada
- Lansdowne Avenue station, a SEPTA trolley stop in Upper Darby Township, Pennsylvania, United States
- Lansdowne Road railway station, an Irish Rail station in Dublin, Ireland
- Lancaster and Lansdowne station, a SEPTA trolley stop in Philadelphia, Pennsylvania, United States

== See also ==
- Lansdowne (disambiguation)
