= Lansdowne Christian Church =

Historic church in Maryland, United States

- Hull Memorial Christian Church
- U.S. National Register of Historic Places
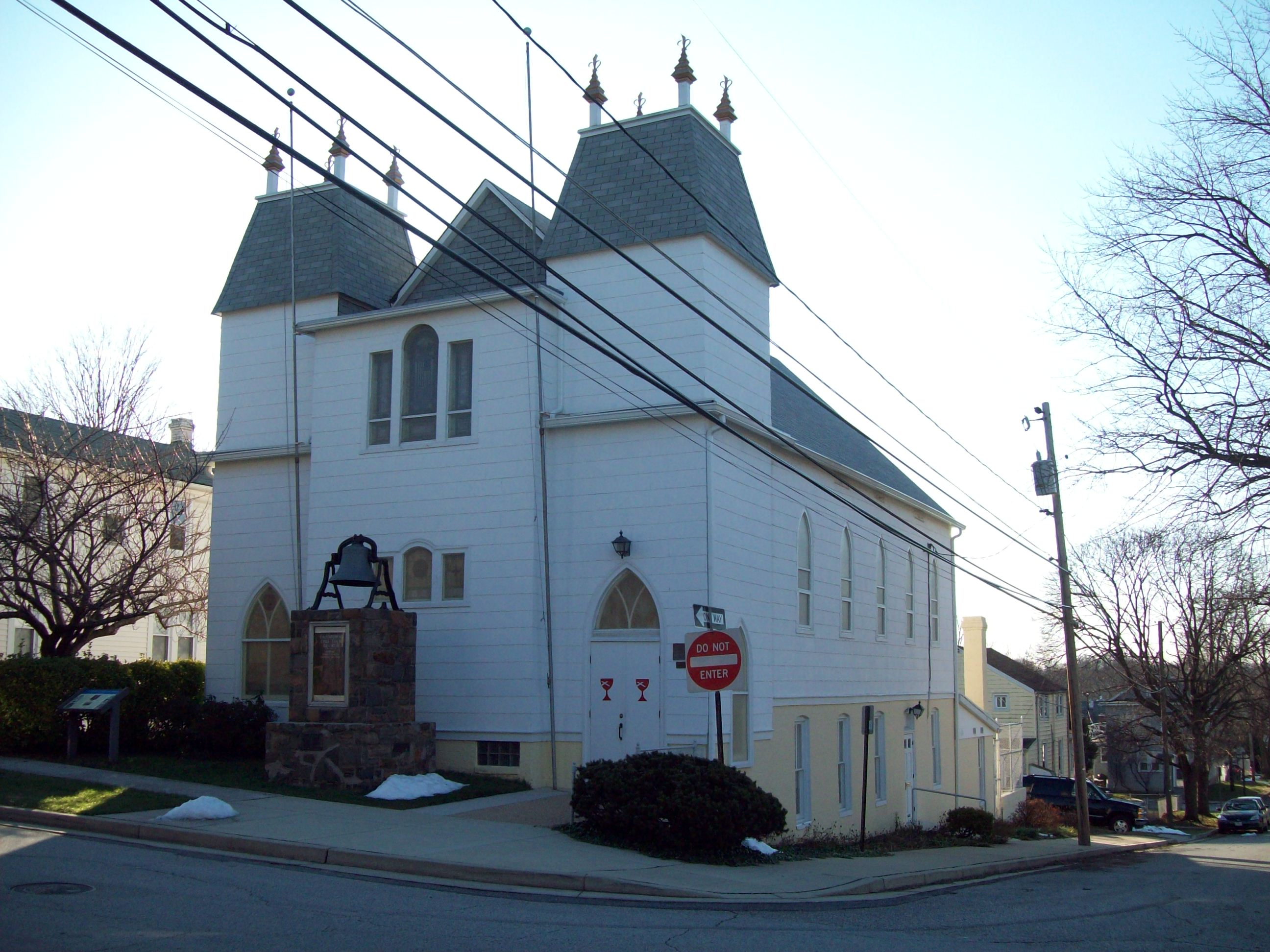
- Lansdowne Christian Church, December 2009

- Location within Maryland Location within the United States
- Location: 101 Clyde Ave., Lansdowne, Maryland
- Coordinates: 39°14′41.9″N 76°39′47.4″W
- Area: less than one acre
- Built: 1903
- Architects: Reeser, Burton W.; Reeser, Lewis & Sons
- NRHP reference No.: 77000684
- Added to NRHP: September 15, 1977

Lansdowne Christian Church (LCC, also known as Hull Memorial) was established in 1903 in Lansdowne, Maryland. Part of the Christian Church (Disciples of Christ) denomination, Lansdowne Christian Church is on Clyde Avenue, Lansdowne in southwest Baltimore County, on the southwestern outskirts of the City of Baltimore. J. B. DeHoff was the first pastor in the early 20th century. The minister is Trent Owings.

== Historical significance ==
The ground and building were donated by a local veteran of the American Civil War (1861–1865), Charles Wesley Hull, and his wife Mary A. Hull. This gift was to honor the Union Army soldiers of the Civil War. The Hulls family also donated other property to benefit the community of early Lansdowne, including land to establish the first volunteer fire company in Lansdowne in 1902. Charles W. Hull was a member and Commander of the Dushane Post #3 of the large influential veterans group, the Grand Army of the Republic (G.A.R.) . He originally served in Ohio before moving to Baltimore. He died March 17, 1926, and is buried in Baltimore.

The wood-frame building covered with shingles and two/twin bell towers was listed on the National Register of Historic Places in 1977, maintained by the National Park Service of the United States Department of the Interior.

== Gallery ==
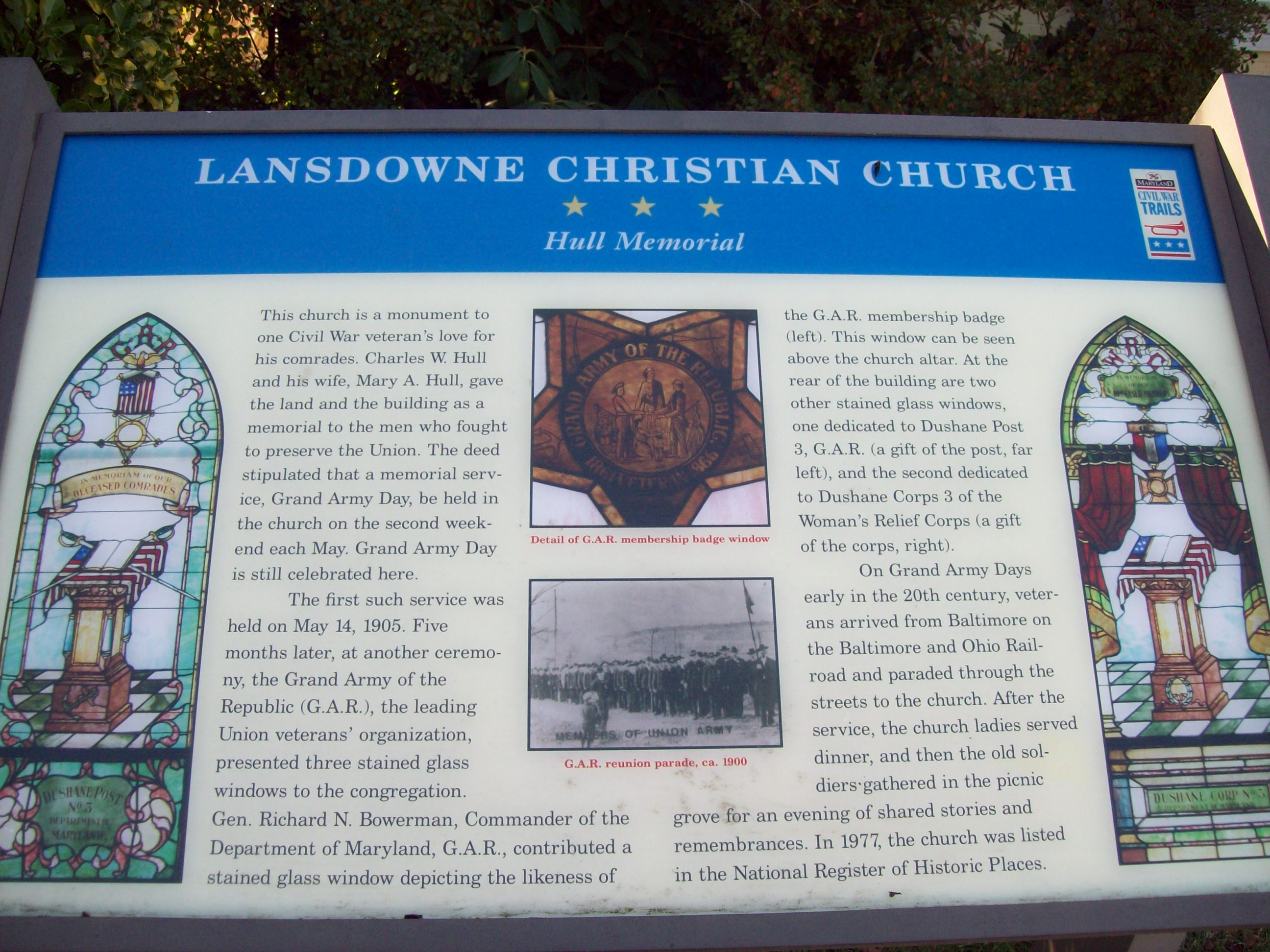
Lansdowne Christian Church-Historic Marker, December 2009
