= Brenda Lansdown =

American educator

- Lansdown, from the 1959 yearbook of Brooklyn College
- Born: January 25, 1904; London, England, U.K.
- Died: July 1, 1990 (aged 86); Boston, Massachusetts, U.S.
- Other names: Lan Benda
- Occupations: Educator, college professor

Brenda Muriel Lansdown (January 25, 1904 – July 1, 1990) was an English-born American math and science educator and a professor of education at Brooklyn College. Her method for teaching science became popular in China after she lectured at Beijing Normal University in the 1980s.

== Early life and education ==
Lansdown was born in London, the daughter of George Arthur Lansdown and Muriel Janet Lansdown. Her father was an architect who served on the Kensington Borough Council. She graduated from Lausanne University, and moved to the United States in 1931. She earned a bachelor's degree from Hunter College.

== Career ==
Lansdown taught at New York City private schools in the 1940s, including the Dalton School and the City and Country School. She was known for her hands-on science lessons, which she called the investigation-colloquium method. She taught education courses at Brooklyn College, Hunter College, and the Harvard Graduate School of Education.

Lansdown was interested in both educational technology and preparing students for a more technologically complex future. In 1958, she spoke about science education in the "Sputnik Age". In 1963, she coordinated a project to develop best practices for effective and engaging videotaped instruction. She traveled to China in 1977 to study science education. In 1984, with UNICEF funding, she returned to China to give workshops on her science teaching method, and spoke at Beijing Normal University.

== Publications ==
Lansdown's academic research was published in scholarly journals including The School Review, Science Education, Childhood Education, The Reading Teacher, The Arithmetic Teacher, Educational Horizons, Science and Children, and Teachers College Record.

- Workbook on scientific thinking (1950)
- "Tutoring Experience for Students in Methods Courses" (1952)
- "Scientific thinking can be taught to function in the everyday life of students" (1953)
- "There's More to Mathematics than the Reckoning" (1954)
- "The Problem of Identification in Learning to Read" (1954)
- "From Cake to Cancellation" (1957)
- Arithmetic for Beginners (1960), published in the U.K. as My Picture Book of Numbers (1962)
- "Creating mathematicians: Poeta fit non nascitur" (1961)
- "Orbiting a science program" (1962)
- Galumph (1963, illustrated by Ernest Crichlow)
- "Exploring rate graphs with gifted ten-year-olds" (1964)
- "Free versus guided experimentation" (1965, with Thomas S. Dietz)
- "One way to change the urban schools" (1967)
- "Insect Interest Transforms a Neighborhood" (1968, with Lisa Pershouse)
- "Hono(u)R the Corn" (1970)
- Teaching Elementary Science Through Investigation and Colloquium (1971)
- "Sharing Science in the Classroom: An Alternative Teaching Method" (1979)

== Personal life ==
Lansdown died in 1990, at the age of 86, in Boston.
