= Lansdowne (Fredericksburg, Virginia) =

Historic house in Virginia, United States

- U.S. National Register of Historic Places
- Virginia Landmarks Register
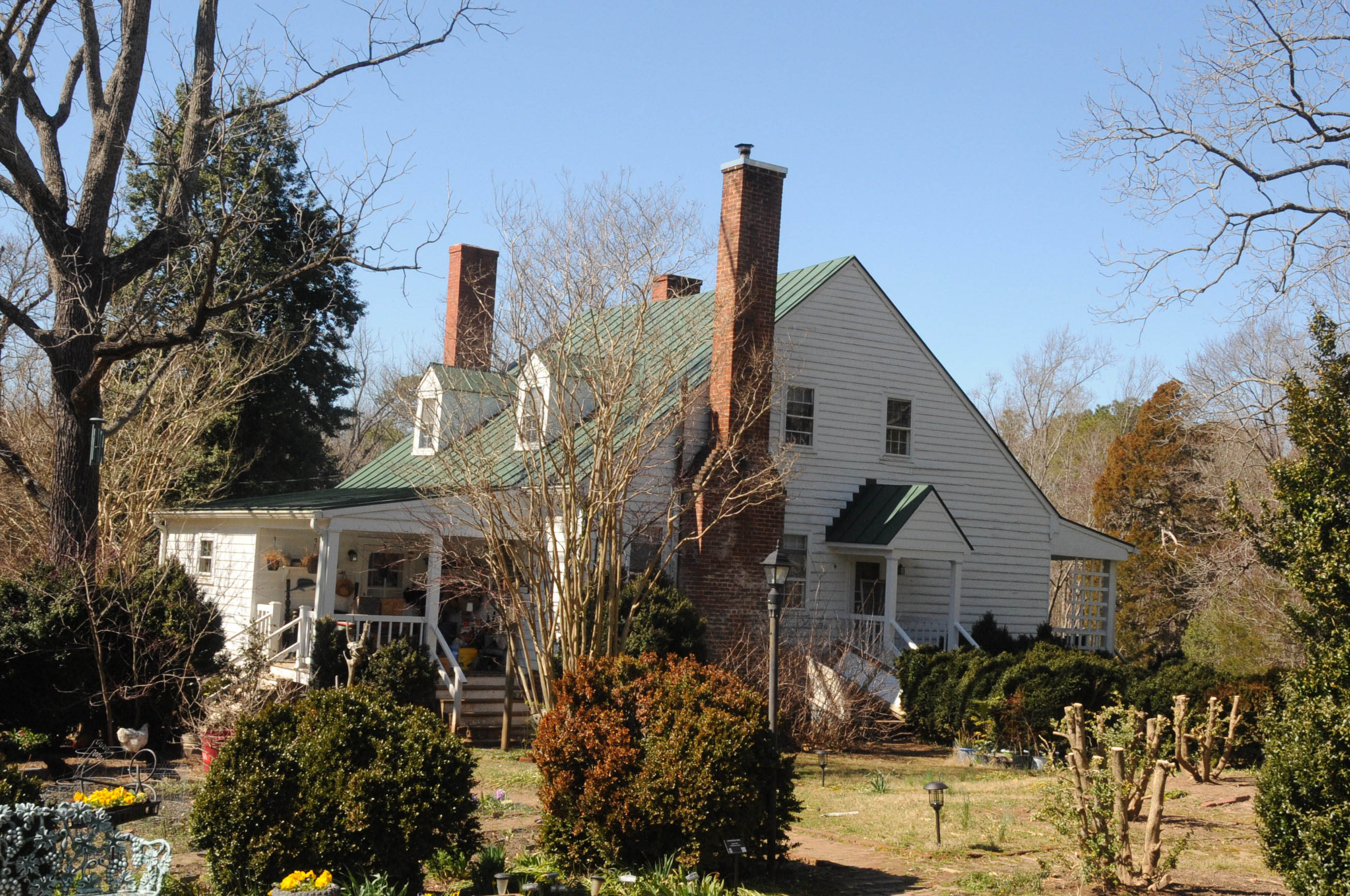
- Side and rear view

- Location within Northern Virginia Location within Virginia Location within the United States
- Location: 4919 Lansdowne Rd., near Fredericksburg, Virginia
- Coordinates: 38°15′18″N 77°28′23″W
- Area: 12 acres (4.9 ha)
- Built: c. 1755, c. 1820s, 1950
- NRHP reference No.: 12001270
- VLR No.: 088-5375

Significant dates
- Added to NRHP: February 5, 2013
- Designated VLR: December 13, 2012

Lansdowne, also known as Retreat Farm and Backus House, is a historic home located near Fredericksburg, in Spotsylvania County, Virginia. The property is very near the Fredericksburg and Spotsylvania National Military Park. The original section was built about 1755, and enlarged in the early-19th century and in 1950. It is a 1 1/2-story, three-bay, side gable-roofed, double-pile, wood-framed dwelling. It features tall exterior chimneys. Also on the property are the contributing board-and-batten, side-gabled frame bank barn (1920s), a cinderblock spring house and cinderblock pumphouse with an early pump (c. 1950), the remnants of a mid-19th century historic formal landscape including terracing, and an historic road trace.

It was listed on the National Register of Historic Places in 2013.
