= Science Education (journal) =

- Discipline: Science education
- Language: English
- Edited by: Ron Gray; Scott McDonald; David Stroupe

Publication details
- Former name: General Science Quarterly
- History: 1916–present
- Publisher: John Wiley & Sons
- Frequency: Bimonthly
- Impact factor: 4.593 (2020)

Standard abbreviations
- ISO 4: Sci. Educ.

Indexing
- CODEN: SEDUAV
- ISSN: 0036-8326 (print); 1098-237X (web)
- LCCN: 20005630
- OCLC no.: 1039000893

Links
- Journal homepage; Online access; Online archive

Science Education is a bimonthly peer-reviewed scientific journal covering science education. It was established in 1916 as General Science Quarterly, obtaining its current name in 1929. The editors-in-chief are Ron Gray (Northern Arizona University), Scott McDonald (Pennsylvania State University) and David Stroupe (University of Utah). According to the Journal Citation Reports, the journal has a 2020 impact factor of 4.593, ranking it 31st out of 265 journals in the category "Education & Educational Research)".
