= Harold Lansdown =

Australian cricketer

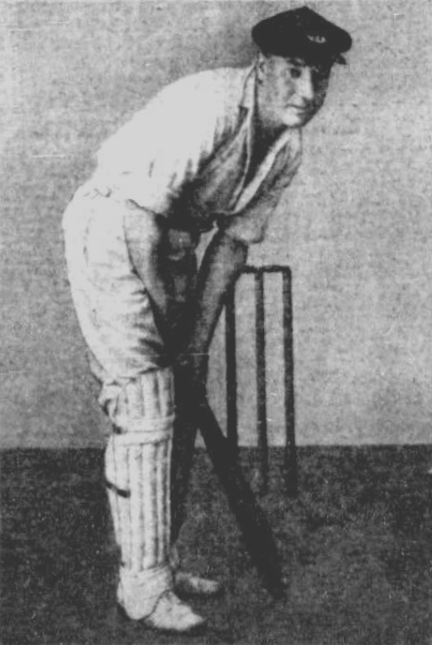

Personal information
- Born: 18 February 1900; Melbourne, Australia
- Died: 18 April 1957 (aged 57); Melbourne, Australia

Domestic team information
- Years: Team
- 1924-1929: Victoria
- Source: Cricinfo, 20 November 2015

Harold Lansdown (18 February 1900 – 18 April 1957) was an Australian cricketer. He played three first-class cricket matches for Victoria between 1924 and 1929.

== See also ==
- List of Victoria first-class cricketers
