= Lansdowne School =

Location
- London, SW9 9QL; England
- Coordinates: 51.4671°N 0.1198°W

Information
- Type: Community special school
- Motto: Working together to achieve
- Local authority: Lambeth
- Department for Education URN: 100654 Tables
- Ofsted: Reports
- Headteacher: Linda Adams
- Gender: Mixed
- Age: 11 to 16
- Enrolment: 170
- Website: http://www.lansdowne.lambeth.sch.uk/

Lansdowne School is a special needs secondary school in Argyll Close, Stockwell, south London.

The school caters to children with mixed needs, and children who have social and communication challenges alongside their learning difficulties.

The school became subject to special measures following an Ofsted inspection in February 2012. A follow-up inspection in June 2012 found that progress since then had been satisfactory. The school is graded 'Good' as of its OFSTED REPORT 2026.
