= Lansdowne College =

Location
- 40-44 Bark Place; Bayswater, London, W2 4AT; England; 51°30′40″N 0°11′22″W

Information
- Type: Private school
- Established: 1976
- Local authority: City of Westminster
- Department for Education URN: 100536 Tables
- Ofsted: Reports
- Principal: Mark Love
- Gender: mixed
- Age: 14 to 19
- Enrolment: 217 (2015/16)
- Website: http://www.lansdownecollege.com/

Lansdowne College was a mixed private school, mainly specialising in sixth form courses. It was situated in Bayswater in the City of Westminster, England. Lansdowne was registered with the DfE and, since joining the ISA in July 2014, was inspected by ISI. Their last inspection was in 2014 and the report declared that "[Students'] learning skills and their attitudes to work are excellent throughout the college. They are single-minded and purposeful and focus clearly on the specific academic goals they have set themselves. Students from many cultural backgrounds support each other strongly, and an atmosphere of tolerance and mutual respect pervades the college."

It had been located in the centre of London opposite Hyde Park and Kensington Gardens after having moved from the original premises in a majestic building on the south side of the Gardens at 9 Palace Gate near the top of Gloucester Road and well known for offering a highly successful LLB law London University External, now International program course.

Lansdowne provided one and two-year A level and GCSE courses for students aged 14 to 19 and a one-year NCUK International Foundation Year for students aged 17 to 19. The primary aim of the college's students was to progress to Higher Education (HE) with destinations including Imperial College, UCL, and the universities of Bristol, Birmingham, Warwick, Leeds, Manchester and Queen Mary . The school most recently had 230 students enrolled with two thirds being British students and the remaining one third from more than twenty countries. The school offered nearly 30 A-Level subjects and twelve GCSE subjects. The last college principal was Mark Love.

In September 2017, Lansdowne College merged with Duff Miller to form Kensington Park School.
