= Lansdowne (surname) =

Lansdowne is a surname, and may refer to:

- Bill Lansdowne (born 1935), English footballer
- Billy Lansdowne (born 1959), English footballer
- Carmen Lansdowne (born 1975), minister of the United Church of Canada
- DeAndre Lansdowne (born 1989), American basketball player
- J. Fenwick Lansdowne (1937–2008), Canadian wildlife artist
- Zachary Lansdowne (1888–1925), American naval officer and aviator

== See also ==
- Lansdown (surname)
