= Baltimore Highlands, Maryland =

- Census-designated place
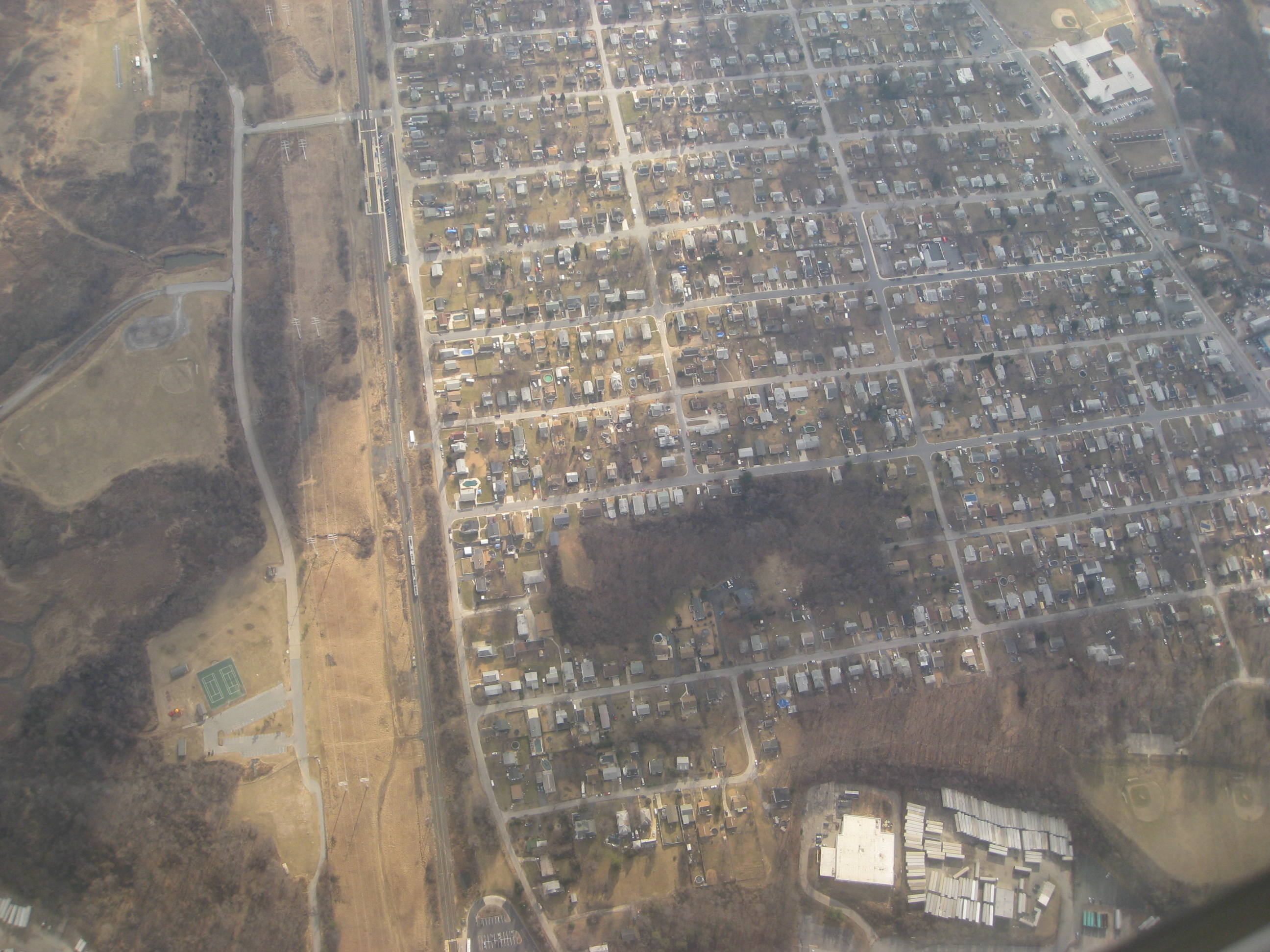
- Aerial view of Baltimore Heights

- Location of Baltimore Highlands, Maryland
- Coordinates: 39°14′09″N 76°38′14″W
- Country: United States
- State: Maryland
- County: Baltimore

Area
  - Total: 1.82 sq mi (4.71 km^{2})
  - Land: 1.73 sq mi (4.49 km^{2})
  - Water: 0.085 sq mi (0.22 km^{2})

Population (2020)
  - Total: 7,740
  - Density: 4,464.2/sq mi (1,723.64/km^{2})
- Time zone: UTC−5 (Eastern (EST))
  - Summer (DST): UTC−4 (EDT)
- ZIP code: 21227
- Area code: 410 and 443
- FIPS code: 24-04050

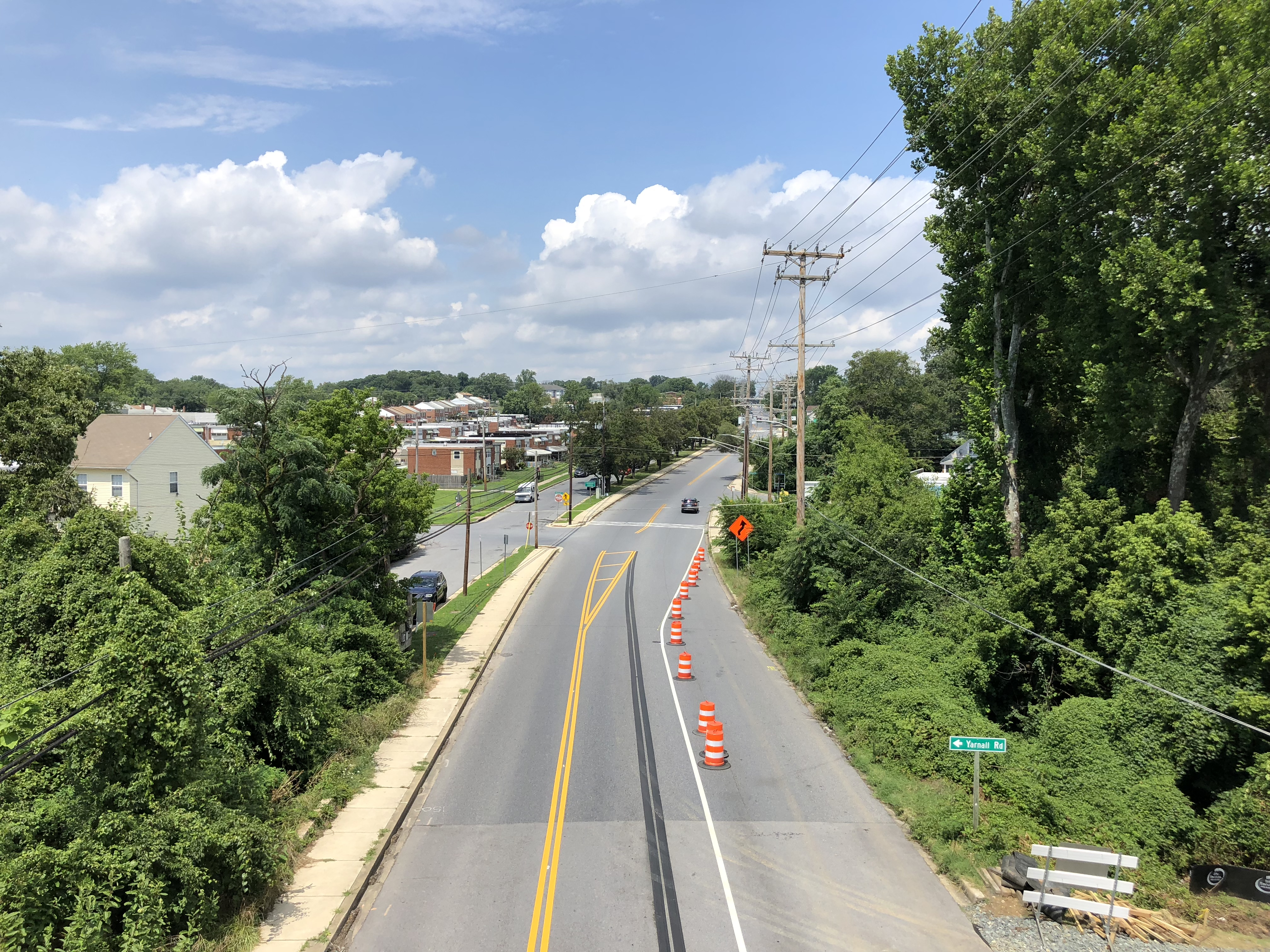
View of the Annapolis Road corridor which runs through the Baltimore Highlands area

Baltimore Highlands is a census-designated place (CDP) in Baltimore County, Maryland, United States, directly south of the city of Baltimore. The population was 7,019 at the 2010 census. At the 2000 census and earlier, the area was delineated as part of the Lansdowne-Baltimore Highlands CDP.

== History ==
In the area known as Baltimore Highlands is a legendary mansion called English Consul. The land and house were owned by William Dawson, the first English Consul to Maryland. One legend claims that Dawson had a brother who was transported from England to America in disgrace. Each year he was to receive a whip lashing as punishment for the crime he had committed. This took place on the English Consul estate. Another legend has it that the mansion was a stop on the Underground Railroad before the Civil War. In 1909 a developer purchased the estate. It was eventually divided into the areas known as Baltimore Highlands, Rosemont, Friendship Gardens and the small section still called English Consul.

In the 1980s Baltimore County Recreation and Parks opened a large parcel of land for public use. Southwest Area Park is located on the Patapsco River just below Baltimore Highlands.

== Geography ==
Baltimore Highlands is located at 39°14′09″N 76°38′14″W (39.2359, −76.6374). It is bounded to the northeast by the border of Baltimore City, to the west by the Baltimore–Washington Parkway, separating the area from Lansdowne, and to the south and southeast by the Patapsco River, which forms the boundary with Anne Arundel County.

According to the United States Census Bureau, the CDP has a total area of 1.8 square miles (4.7 km^{2}), of which 1.7 square miles (4.5 km^{2}) is land and 0.08 square miles (0.2 km^{2}), or 4.80%, is water.

=== Transit ===
The community is served by Baltimore Light Rail, which stops at the Baltimore Highlands station.

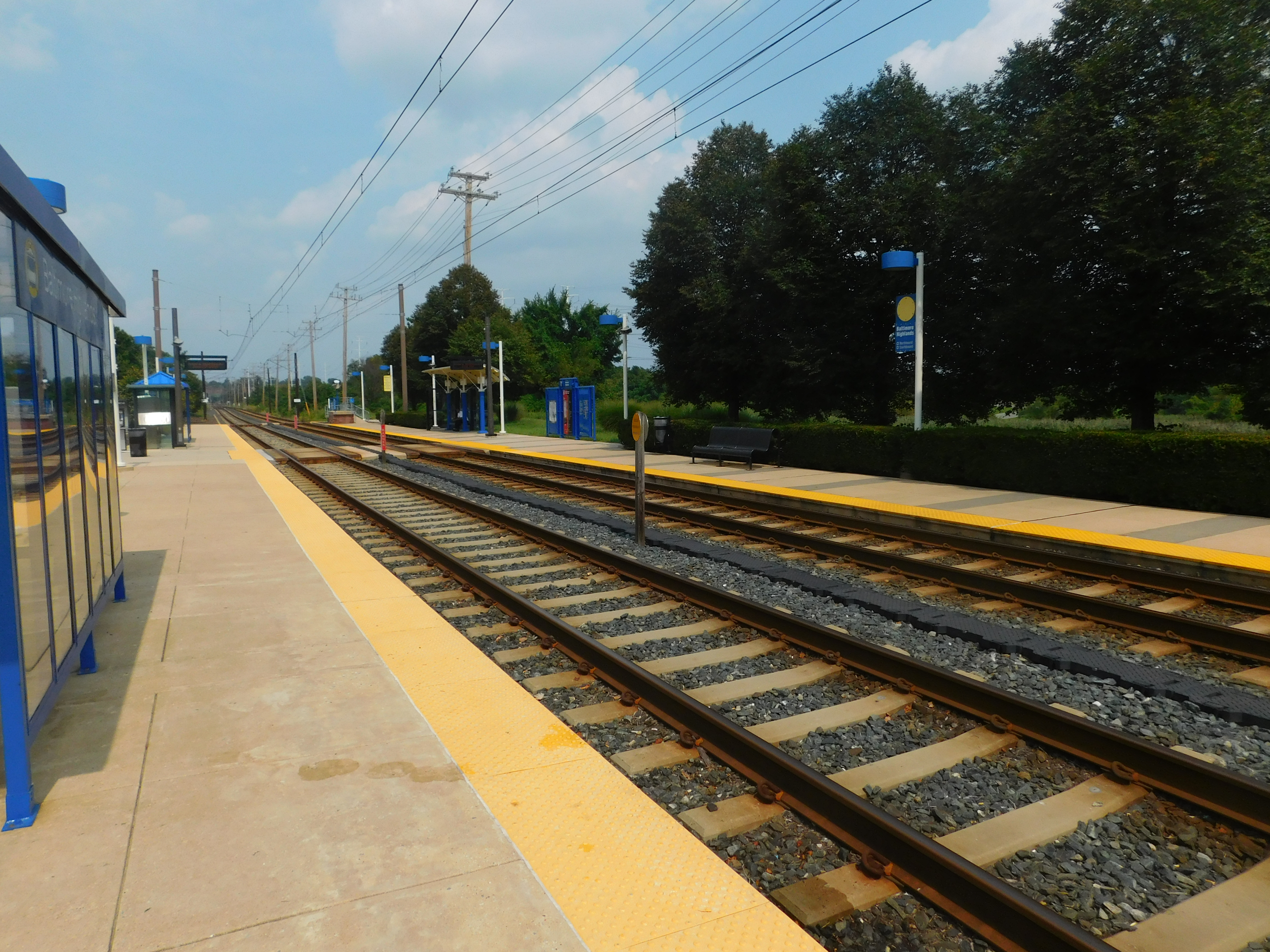
Baltimore Highlands station

=== Roads ===
Annapolis Road (Maryland Route 648) runs north–south through Baltimore Highlands. To the north it enters Baltimore City, where it crosses West Patapsco Avenue. To the south, it crosses the Patapsco River into the Pumphrey section of Anne Arundel County and an intersection with Maryland Route 170.

== Demographics ==
Historical population
Census	Pop.	Note	%±
1960	13,134		—
1970	17,770		35.3%
1980	16,759		−5.7%
1990	15,509		−7.5%
2000	15,724		1.4%
2010	7,019		−55.4%
2020	7,740		10.3%
Separated from Lansdowne-Baltimore Highlands CDP in 2010 Census

Baltimore Highlands first appeared in the 2010 U.S. census after the Lansdowne-Baltimore Highlands CDP was divided into Baltimore Highlands CDP and Lansdowne CDP.

=== Racial and ethnic composition ===
Baltimore Highlands CDP, Maryland – racial and ethnic composition Note: the US Census treats Hispanic/Latino as an ethnic category. This table excludes Latinos from the racial categories and assigns them to a separate category. Hispanics/Latinos may be of any race.
Race / Ethnicity (NH = Non-Hispanic)	Pop 2010	Pop 2020	% 2010	% 2020
White alone (NH)	4,085	3,408	58.20%	44.03%
Black or African American alone (NH)	1,486	1,550	21.17%	20.03%
Native American or Alaska Native alone (NH)	18	18	0.26%	0.23%
Asian alone (NH)	199	300	2.84%	3.88%
Native Hawaiian or Pacific Islander alone (NH)	8	3	0.11%	0.04%
Other race alone (NH)	2	59	0.03%	0.76%
Mixed race or Multiracial (NH)	213	403	3.03%	5.21%
Hispanic or Latino (any race)	1,008	1,999	14.36%	25.83%
Total	7,019	7,740	100.00%	100.00%

=== 2020 census ===
As of the 2020 census, Baltimore Highlands had a population of 7,740. The median age was 33.9 years. 26.4% of residents were under the age of 18 and 11.0% of residents were 65 years of age or older. For every 100 females there were 100.4 males, and for every 100 females age 18 and over there were 96.1 males age 18 and over.

100.0% of residents lived in urban areas, while 0.0% lived in rural areas.

There were 2,726 households in Baltimore Highlands, of which 39.1% had children under the age of 18 living in them. Of all households, 37.4% were married-couple households, 21.2% were households with a male householder and no spouse or partner present, and 29.3% were households with a female householder and no spouse or partner present. About 23.0% of all households were made up of individuals and 8.3% had someone living alone who was 65 years of age or older.

There were 2,910 housing units, of which 6.3% were vacant. The homeowner vacancy rate was 2.0% and the rental vacancy rate was 7.2%.

=== 2010 census ===
At the 2010 census, there were 7,019 people, 2,525 households, and 1,751 families in the CDP. The population density was 3,870 inhabitants per square mile (1,490/km^{2}). There were 2,708 housing units at an average density of 1,592.9 per square mile (615.0/km^{2}). The racial makeup of the CDP was 63.8% White, 21.7% African American, 0.4% Native American, 2.8% Asian, 0.1% Pacific Islander, 7.3 some other race, and 3.9% from two or more races. Hispanic or Latino of any race were 14.4%.

Of the 2,525 households, 32.1% had children under the age of 18 living with them, 39.0% were headed by married couples living together, 22.0% had a female householder with no husband present, and 30.7% were non-families. 22.1% of households were made up of individuals, and 6.3% were one person aged 65 or older. The average household size was 2.78, and the average family size was 3.20.

The age distribution was 25.3% under the age of 18, 12.5% from 18 to 24, 29.5% from 25 to 44, 23.8% from 45 to 64, and 8.7% 65 or older. The median age was 31.7 years. For every 100 females, there were 96.1 males. For every 100 females age 18 and over, there were 94.0 males.
