= Lansdowne-Baltimore Highlands, Maryland =

- Former census-designated place
- Location of Lansdowne-Baltimore Highlands, Maryland
- Coordinates: 39°14′20″N 76°39′4″W
- Country: United States
- State: Maryland
- County: Baltimore

Area
  - Total: 4.3 sq mi (11.1 km^{2})
  - Land: 4.1 sq mi (10.6 km^{2})
  - Water: 0.19 sq mi (0.5 km^{2})

Population (2000)
  - Total: 15,724
  - Density: 3,837/sq mi (1,481.4/km^{2})
- Time zone: UTC−5 (Eastern (EST))
  - Summer (DST): UTC−4 (EDT)
- ZIP code: 21227
- Area code: 410 and 443
- FIPS code: 24-45662

Lansdowne-Baltimore Highlands was a census-designated place (CDP) in Baltimore County, Maryland, United States. The population was 15,724 at the 2000 census. At the 2010 census the area was split into two separate CDPs, the unincorporated communities of Lansdowne and Baltimore Highlands.

== Geography ==
Lansdowne-Baltimore Highlands was located at 39°14′20″N 76°39′4″W (39.238782, −76.651246).

According to the United States Census Bureau, the CDP had a total area of 4.3 square miles (11 km^{2}), of which, 4.1 square miles (11 km^{2}) of it is land and 0.2 square miles (0.52 km^{2}) of it (4.21%) is water.

== Demographics ==
Lansdowne-Baltimore Highlands CDP, Maryland – Racial and ethnic composition Note: the US Census treats Hispanic/Latino as an ethnic category. This table excludes Latinos from the racial categories and assigns them to a separate category. Hispanics/Latinos may be of any race.
Race / Ethnicity (NH = Non-Hispanic)	Pop 2000	% 2000
White alone (NH)	11,689	74.34%
Black or African American alone (NH)	2,867	18.23%
Native American or Alaska Native alone (NH)	53	0.34%
Asian alone (NH)	290	1.84%
Native Hawaiian or Pacific Islander alone (NH)	3	0.02%
Other race alone (NH)	21	0.13%
Mixed race or Multiracial (NH)	244	1.55%
Hispanic or Latino (any race)	557	3.54%
Total	15,724	100.00%

As of the census of 2000, there were 15,724 people, 5,796 households, and 4,190 families residing in the CDP. The population density was 3,836.8 inhabitants per square mile (1,481.4/km^{2}). There were 6,041 housing units at an average density of 1,474.1 per square mile (569.2/km^{2}). The racial makeup of the CDP was 75.70% White, 18.37% African American, 0.36% Native American, 1.86% Asian, 0.03% Pacific Islander, 1.74% from other races, and 1.95% from two or more races. Hispanic or Latino of any race were 3.54% of the population.

There were 5,796 households, out of which 39.1% had children under the age of 18 living with them, 42.0% were married couples living together, 24.1% had a female householder with no husband present, and 27.7% were non-families. 21.8% of all households were made up of individuals, and 7.7% had someone living alone who was 65 years of age or older. The average household size was 2.71 and the average family size was 3.11.

In the CDP, the population was spread out, with 29.6% under the age of 18, 10.6% from 18 to 24, 30.4% from 25 to 44, 19.2% from 45 to 64, and 10.3% who were 65 years of age or older. The median age was 32 years. For every 100 females, there were 89.5 males. For every 100 females age 18 and over, there were 83.9 males.

The median income for a household in the CDP was $37,160, and the median income for a family was $41,559. Males had a median income of $33,244 versus $22,906 for females. The per capita income for the CDP was $16,348. About 12.7% of families and 13.8% of the population were below the poverty line, including 20.6% of those under age 18 and 6.7% of those age 65 or over.
