= Lansdowne, Maryland =

- Census-designated place
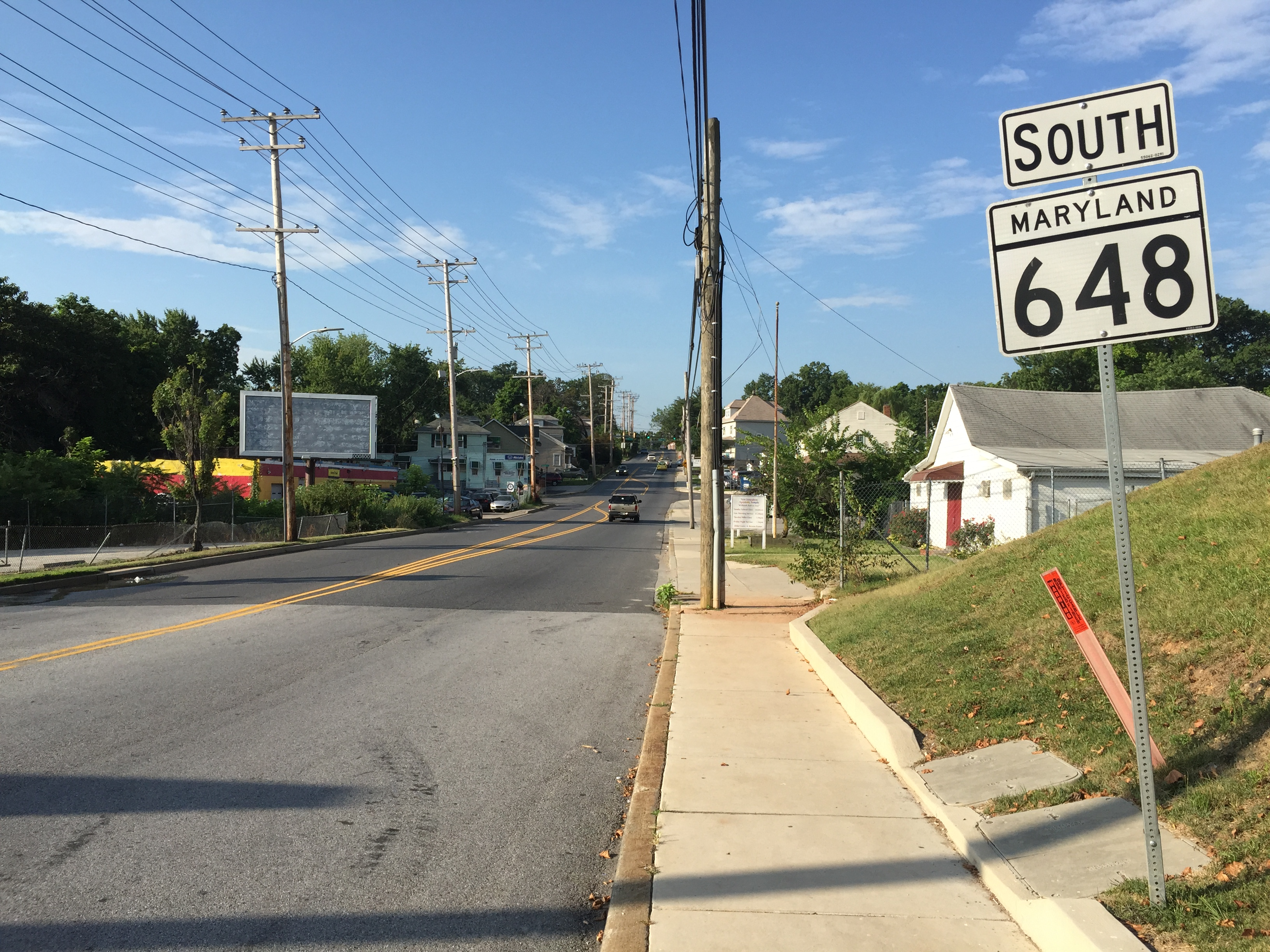
- View south along Maryland State Route 648 (Annapolis Road) entering Lansdowne

- Flag

- Location of Lansdowne in Maryland
- Coordinates: 39°14′35″N 76°39′30″W
- Country: United States
- State: Maryland
- County: Baltimore
- Established: 1892

Area
  - Total: 2.41 sq mi (6.23 km^{2})
  - Land: 2.28 sq mi (5.90 km^{2})
  - Water: 0.13 sq mi (0.33 km^{2})

Population (2020)
  - Total: 9,004
  - Density: 3,955.4/sq mi (1,527.19/km^{2})
- Time zone: UTC−5 (Eastern (EST))
  - Summer (DST): UTC−4 (EDT)
- ZIP code: 21227
- Area code: 410 and 443
- FIPS code: 24-45650

Lansdowne is a census-designated place in southern Baltimore County, Maryland, United States, located just south of Baltimore. As of the 2010 census, it had a population of 8,409. At the 2000 census and earlier, the area was delineated as part of the Lansdowne-Baltimore Highlands CDP.

== History ==
In the late 1800s, the Whitaker Iron Company mined for ore in Lansdowne. Abandoned pits from the mining were filled up by underground springs creating small ponds and lakes. Lansdowne was mostly farmland, including the Kessler farm, MacLeod farm and Wades farm.

When the railroad came, Lansdowne became known as a B&O town. Most people worked for the B&O, commuting by train into Baltimore. The first station was named Coursey Station. The Coursey Station senior housing center takes its name from this.

The two main roads were Hammonds Ferry Road and Hollins Ferry Road, both of which led to the Patapsco River where there was once a ferry in operation.

Early churches included the Lutheran Church of Our Savior, St. Clements Catholic Church, Lansdowne United Methodist Church, Lansdowne Christian Church and the First Baptist Church. The Hull Memorial Christian Church was listed on the National Register of Historic Places in 1977. The site of the original wooden school house was on the property that is now St. Clements.

In the 1950s housing developments sprang up in the Riverview area, and new schools were built for these neighborhoods. The Lansdowne Elementary School, Lansdowne Middle School and Lansdowne Senior High were known as the "Golden Education Triangle."

In the early 1960s the B&O closed the railroad crossing and Lansdowne Boulevard was constructed, connecting Lansdowne to Washington Boulevard, bridging over the railroad tracks. A tunnel was also constructed under the tracks for pedestrian crossing. As of 2023 the pedestrian tunnel has been closed. However, the railroad crossing effectively divided the community into two separate parts. Some old railroad cars were erected as a museum and shopping area alongside Hammonds Ferry Road and the railroad tracks.

In the 1980s Baltimore County Recreation and Parks opened a large parcel of land for public use. Southwest Area Park is located on the Patapsco River, just below Baltimore Highlands.

A small library was built by Baltimore County in 1966, on Third Avenue. In 1993, the Lansdowne Library was closed due to budget cutbacks. The building is now used as the Police Athletic League Center. In 1989 the Lansdowne/Baltimore Highlands Senior Center was built directly behind the Library building. The library reopened on April 8, 2006 with much support from the Lansdowne Improvement Association.

The Lansdowne Improvement Association has been instrumental in much community support, pride and beautification. With a grant from Baltimore Community Foundation they were able to have a gateway sign installed welcoming visitors to the community of Lansdowne as well as Baltimore Highlands and Riverview.

== Geography ==
Lansdowne is located at 39°14′35″N 76°39′30″W (39.2431, −76.6585). It is bounded to the northeast by the border of Baltimore, to the northwest by the former Baltimore and Ohio Railroad (now CSX Transportation), separating the area from Arbutus to the west, to the south by the Patapsco River, which forms the boundary with Anne Arundel County, and to the east by the Baltimore–Washington Parkway, separating Lansdowne from Baltimore Highlands to the east.

According to the United States Census Bureau, the CDP has a total area of 2.4 square miles (6.2 km^{2}), of which 2.3 square miles (5.9 km^{2}) is land and 0.12 square miles (0.3 km^{2}), or 5.30%, is water.

== Roads ==
=== Lansdowne Road ===
Lansdowne Road is a main road which travels through Lansdowne into South Baltimore (city). The road starts at Hollins Ferry Road and travels west past Lansdowne High School to Hammonds Ferry Road, then to Washington Boulevard.

=== Hollins Ferry Road ===
The road starts at Halethorpe Farms Road in the Halethorpe area and proceeds east across I-695, then crosses the Baltimore (city) line after passing Lansdowne Road/Daisy Avenue to Patapsco Avenue, ending at US-1/Washington Boulevard.

=== Hammonds Ferry Road ===
Hammonds Ferry Road starts at Andover Road in Linthicum Heights in Anne Arundel County, then travels north, crossing the county line into Lansdowne and passing under the Baltimore Beltway and the Harbor Tunnel Thruway. It then hits Hollins Ferry Road and continues until it reaches Caton Avenue/Patapsco Avenue.

== Demographics ==
Historical population
Census	Pop.	Note	%±
1960	13,134		—
1970	17,770		35.3%
1980	16,759		−5.7%
1990	15,509		−7.5%
2000	15,724		1.4%
2010	8,409		−46.5%
2020	9,004		7.1%
Separated from the deleted Lansdowne-Baltimore Highlands CDP in the 2010 Census

Lansdowne first appeared in the 2010 U.S. census after the Lansdowne-Baltimore Highlands CDP was divided into the Baltimore Highlands CDP and the Lansdowne CDP.

=== Racial and ethnic composition ===
Lansdowne CDP, Maryland – Racial and ethnic composition Note: the US Census treats Hispanic/Latino as an ethnic category. This table excludes Latinos from the racial categories and assigns them to a separate category. Hispanics/Latinos may be of any race.
Race / Ethnicity (NH = Non-Hispanic)	Pop 2010	Pop 2020	% 2010	% 2020
White alone (NH)	5,340	4,094	63.50%	45.47%
Black or African American alone (NH)	2,004	2,098	23.83%	23.30%
Native American or Alaska Native alone (NH)	17	20	0.20%	0.22%
Asian alone (NH)	174	373	2.07%	4.14%
Native Hawaiian or Pacific Islander alone (NH)	0	4	0.00%	0.04%
Other race alone (NH)	6	69	0.07%	0.77%
Mixed race or Multiracial (NH)	218	476	2.59%	5.29%
Hispanic or Latino (any race)	650	1,870	7.73%	20.77%
Total	8,409	9,004	100.00%	100.00%

=== 2020 census ===
As of the 2020 census, Lansdowne had a population of 9,004. The median age was 32.7 years. 29.0% of residents were under the age of 18 and 10.8% of residents were 65 years of age or older. For every 100 females there were 92.6 males, and for every 100 females age 18 and over there were 88.5 males age 18 and over.

100.0% of residents lived in urban areas, while 0.0% lived in rural areas.

There were 3,131 households in Lansdowne, of which 41.4% had children under the age of 18 living in them. Of all households, 35.1% were married-couple households, 17.9% were households with a male householder and no spouse or partner present, and 36.5% were households with a female householder and no spouse or partner present. About 25.2% of all households were made up of individuals and 9.7% had someone living alone who was 65 years of age or older.

There were 3,350 housing units, of which 6.5% were vacant. The homeowner vacancy rate was 2.4% and the rental vacancy rate was 7.0%.

=== 2010 census ===
As of the 2010 census, there were 8,409 people, 3,057 households, and 2,132 families residing in the CDP. The population density was 3,513 inhabitants per square mile (1,356/km^{2}). There were 3,255 housing units, at an average density of 1,415.2 per square mile (546.4/km^{2}). The racial makeup of the CDP was 67.0% White, 23.9% African American, 0.2% Native American, 2.1% Asian, 0.0% Pacific Islander, 3.7 some other race, and 3.0% from two or more races. Hispanic or Latino of any race were 7.7% of the population.

There were 3,057 households, out of which 35.0% had children under the age of 18 living with them, 34.1% were headed by married couples living together, 28.3% had a female householder with no husband present, and 30.3% were non-families. 23.6% of all households were made up of individuals, and 10.1% had someone living alone who was 65 years of age or older. The average household size was 2.75, and the average family size was 3.21.

In the CDP, the population was spread out, with 28.6% under the age of 18, 10.9% from 18 to 24, 27.7% from 25 to 44, 21.9% from 45 to 64, and 11.0% who were 65 years of age or older. The median age was 30.8 years. For every 100 females, there were 87.3 males. For every 100 females age 18 and over, there were 82.4 males.
