= 2008 United States presidential election in Maryland =

- November 4, 2008
- Turnout: 77.63%

Nominee	Barack Obama	John McCain
Party	Democratic	Republican
Home state	Illinois	Arizona
Running mate	Joe Biden	Sarah Palin
Electoral vote	10	0
Popular vote	1,629,467	959,862
Percentage	61.92%	36.47%

Obama
40–50%
50–60%
60–70%
70–80%
80–90%
McCain
40–50%
50–60%
60–70%
President before election
George W. Bush
Republican
Elected President
Barack Obama
Democratic

The 2008 United States presidential election in Maryland took place on November 4, 2008, and was part of the 2008 United States presidential election. Voters chose 10 representatives, or electors to the Electoral College, who voted for president and vice president.

Maryland was won by Democratic nominee Barack Obama by a 25.4% margin of victory. Prior to the election, all 17 news organizations considered this a state Obama would win, or otherwise considered as a safe blue state. Maryland has voted for the Democratic presidential candidate of every election since 1992. In 2008, Obama easily captured the state's 10 electoral votes in a landslide victory, winning 61.92% of the popular vote to Republican John McCain's 36.47%.

== Primaries ==
- 2008 Maryland Democratic presidential primary
- 2008 Maryland Republican presidential primary

== Campaign ==
=== Predictions ===
There were 16 news organizations who made state-by-state predictions of the election. Here are their last predictions before election day:

Source	Ranking
D.C. Political Report	Likely D
Cook Political Report	Solid D
The Takeaway	Solid D
Electoral-vote.com	Solid D
Washington Post	Solid D
Politico	Solid D
RealClearPolitics	Solid D
FiveThirtyEight	Solid D
CQ Politics	Solid D
The New York Times	Solid D
CNN	Safe D
NPR	Solid D
MSNBC	Solid D
Fox News	Likely D
Associated Press	Likely D
Rasmussen Reports	Safe D

=== Polling ===
Obama won every single pre-election poll, each by a double-digit margin of victory and at least 51% of the vote. The final 3 polls averaged Obama leading 54% to 38%.

=== Fundraising ===
John McCain raised a total of $3,439,120 in the state. Barack Obama raised $19,091,136.

=== Advertising and visits ===
Obama spent $257,582 while McCain spent nothing. Both tickets visited the state once.

== Analysis ==
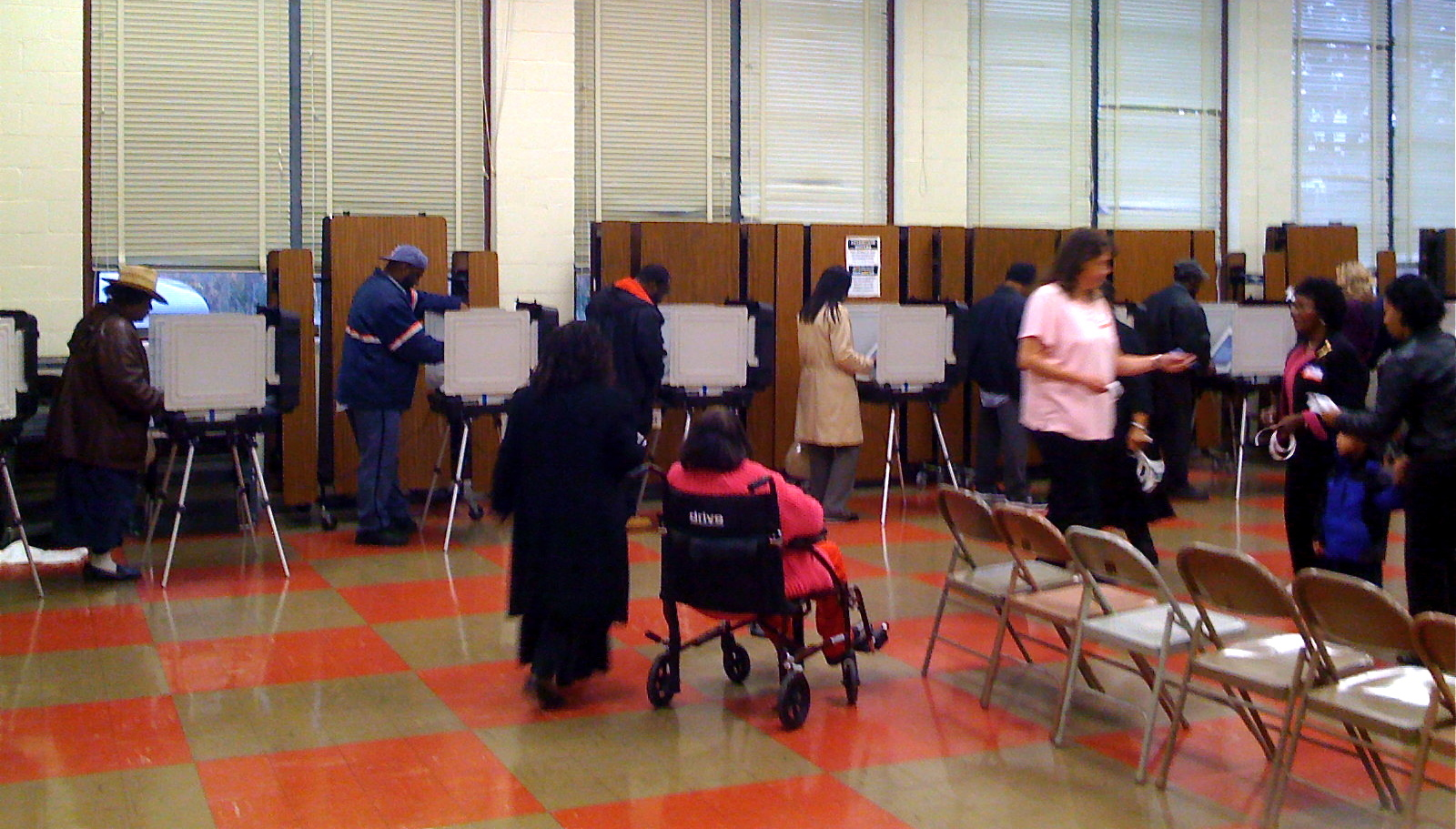
Voting taking place at a Maryland polling station

Maryland has supported the Democratic nominee in each of the last five presidential elections by an average margin of 15.4%. In 1980, it was 1 of only 6 states to vote for Democrat Jimmy Carter over Republican Ronald Reagan. It has only supported a Republican six times since Franklin D. Roosevelt – 1948 and the Republican landslides of 1952, 1956, 1972, 1984 and 1988.

Maryland is often among the Democratic nominees' best states. In 1992, Bill Clinton fared better in Maryland than any other state except his home state of Arkansas. In 1996, Maryland was Clinton's sixth best, in 2000 Maryland ranked fourth for Al Gore and in 2004 John Kerry showed his fifth best performance in Maryland.

Republican presidential candidates typically win more counties by running up huge margins in western Maryland and the Eastern Shore. However, they are usually swamped by the heavily Democratic Baltimore-Washington, D.C. axis, which casts almost 75% of the state's vote. The state's four largest county-level jurisdictions – Montgomery, Prince George's and Baltimore counties and the City of Baltimore — are strongly Democratic. These areas, which contain 1.5 million voters combined, make it extremely difficult for a Republican to win Maryland. Even in bad years for Democrats, a Republican usually has to run the table in the rest of the state and win either Montgomery, Prince George's or Baltimore counties to have a realistic chance of carrying the state. In 1984, for instance, Ronald Reagan only carried Maryland by crushing Walter Mondale in Baltimore County and narrowly winning Montgomery. In 1988, George H. W. Bush ran up a 42,300-vote margin in Baltimore County over Michael Dukakis – almost 85% of his statewide margin of 49,800 votes.

The 2008 election was no exception. Barack Obama won the state's 10 electoral votes in 2008 with 61.92% of the vote to John McCain's 36.47%. Obama carried Montgomery, Prince George's, Baltimore County and Baltimore City with 71.6%, 88.9%, 56.2 and 87.2% of the vote, respectively. Obama's combined 550,000-vote margin in these four areas would have been enough to carry the state. While McCain won more counties, the only large county he won was Anne Arundel County, home to the state capital, Annapolis. In this election, Maryland voted 18.17% to the left of the nation at-large.

In 2008, Democrats picked up a U.S. House an open seat in Maryland's 1st Congressional District as Democrat Frank M. Kratovil, Jr. defeated Republican Andy Harris by less than a 1% margin of victory.

== Results ==
2008 United States presidential election in Maryland
Party	Candidate	Running mate	Votes	Percentage	Electoral votes
Democratic	Barack Obama	Joe Biden	1,629,467	61.92%	10
Republican	John McCain	Sarah Palin	959,862	36.47%	0
Independent	Ralph Nader	Matt Gonzalez	14,713	0.56%	0
Libertarian	Bob Barr	Wayne Allyn Root	9,842	0.44%	0
Independent	Write-in candidates		9,063	0.34%	0
Green	Cynthia McKinney	Rosa Clemente	4,747	0.18%	0
Constitution	Chuck Baldwin	Darrell Castle	3,760	0.14%	0
America's Independent	Alan Keyes (write-in)	Brian Rohrbough	103	0.00%	0
Unaffiliated	Donald Kenneth Allen (write-in)	Christopher Borcik	17	0.00%	0
Independent	Blaine Taylor (write-in)	n/a	12	0.00%	0
Socialist USA	Brian Moore (write-in)	Stewart Alexander	10	0.00%	0
Totals			2,631,596	100.00%	10
Voter turnout (Voting age population)					62.4%

=== By county ===
County	Barack Obama Democratic		John McCain Republican		Various candidates Other parties		Margin		Total votes cast
County	#	%	#	%	#	%	#	%	Total votes cast
Allegany	10,693	35.95%	18,405	61.88%	644	2.17%	-7,712	-25.93%	29,742
Anne Arundel	125,015	48.15%	129,682	49.95%	4,922	1.90%	-4,667	-1.80%	259,619
Baltimore	214,151	56.22%	158,714	41.66%	8,073	2.12%	55,437	14.55%	380,938
Baltimore City	214,385	87.16%	28,681	11.66%	2,902	1.18%	185,704	75.50%	245,968
Calvert	20,299	46.07%	23,095	52.42%	663	1.50%	-2,796	-6.35%	44,057
Caroline	4,971	37.61%	8,015	60.64%	232	1.76%	-3,044	-23.03%	13,218
Carroll	28,060	33.11%	54,503	64.30%	2,197	2.59%	-26,443	-31.20%	84,760
Cecil	17,665	41.57%	23,855	56.14%	974	2.29%	-6,190	-14.57%	42,494
Charles	43,635	62.22%	25,732	36.69%	760	1.08%	17,903	25.53%	70,127
Dorchester	6,912	45.25%	8,168	53.48%	194	1.27%	-1,256	-8.22%	15,274
Frederick	54,013	48.58%	55,170	49.62%	2,003	1.80%	-1,157	-1.04%	111,186
Garrett	3,736	29.02%	8,903	69.17%	233	1.81%	-5,167	-40.14%	12,872
Harford	48,552	39.38%	71,751	58.19%	2,992	2.43%	-23,199	-18.82%	123,295
Howard	87,120	59.99%	55,393	38.14%	2,720	1.87%	31,727	21.85%	145,233
Kent	4,953	49.43%	4,905	48.95%	162	1.62%	48	0.48%	10,020
Montgomery	314,444	71.58%	118,608	27.00%	6,209	1.41%	195,836	44.58%	439,261
Prince George's	332,396	88.87%	38,833	10.38%	2,797	0.75%	293,563	78.49%	374,026
Queen Anne's	8,575	35.66%	15,087	62.74%	383	1.59%	-6,512	-27.08%	24,045
Somerset	4,779	48.16%	5,037	50.76%	108	1.09%	-258	-2.60%	9,924
St. Mary's	19,023	42.84%	24,705	55.63%	681	1.53%	-5,682	-12.79%	44,409
Talbot	9,035	44.45%	10,995	54.09%	298	1.47%	-1,960	-9.64%	20,328
Washington	26,245	42.61%	34,169	55.47%	1,186	1.93%	-7,924	-12.86%	61,600
Wicomico	19,436	46.44%	21,849	52.20%	569	1.36%	-2,413	-5.77%	41,854
Worcester	11,374	41.59%	15,607	57.07%	365	1.33%	-4,233	-15.48%	27,346
Totals	1,629,467	61.92%	959,862	36.47%	42,267	1.61%	669,605	25.45%	2,631,596

County that flipped from Republican to Democratic

- Kent (largest borough: Chestertown)

=== By congressional district ===
Barack Obama carried six of Maryland's eight congressional districts. McCain carried two congressional districts, including one that was won by a Democrat.

District	Obama	McCain	Representative
1st	39.81%	58.26%	Wayne Gilchrest (110th Congress)
1st	39.81%	58.26%	Frank Kratovil (111th Congress)
2nd	59.84%	38.25%	Dutch Ruppersberger
3rd	58.78%	39.23%	John Sarbanes
4th	85.06%	14.16%	Albert Wynn (110th Congress)
4th	85.06%	14.16%	Donna Edwards (111th Congress)
5th	65.44%	33.30%	Steny Hoyer
6th	40.19%	57.65%	Roscoe Bartlett
7th	78.79%	19.89%	Elijah Cummings
8th	73.88%	24.70%	Chris Van Hollen

== Electors ==
Technically the voters of Maryland cast their ballots for electors: representatives to the Electoral College. Maryland is allocated 10 electors because it has 8 congressional districts and 2 senators. All candidates who appear on the ballot or qualify to receive write-in votes must submit a list of 10 electors, who pledge to vote for their candidate and their running mate. Whoever wins the majority of votes in the state is awarded all 10 electoral votes. Their chosen electors then vote for president and vice president. Although electors are pledged to their candidate and running mate, they are not obligated to vote for them. An elector who votes for someone other than their candidate is known as a faithless elector.

The electors of each state and the District of Columbia met on December 15, 2008, to cast their votes for president and vice president. The Electoral College itself never meets as one body. Instead the electors from each state and the District of Columbia met in their respective capitols.

The following were the members of the Electoral College from the state. All 10 were pledged to Barack Obama and Joe Biden:

1. Gene M. Ransom III
2. Delores Kelley
3. Guy Guzzone
4. Nathaniel Exum
5. Chris Reynolds
6. Bobby Fouche
7. Elizabeth Bobo
8. Michael Barnes
9. Susan Lee
10. Rainier Harvey, Sr.

== See also ==
- United States presidential elections in Maryland
- 2008 United States presidential election
- 2008 United States elections
