= 2004 United States presidential election in Maryland =

- November 2, 2004
- Turnout: 78.03% ▲

Nominee	John Kerry	George W. Bush
Party	Democratic	Republican
Home state	Massachusetts	Texas
Running mate	John Edwards	Dick Cheney
Electoral vote	10	0
Popular vote	1,334,493	1,024,703
Percentage	55.91%	42.93%

Kerry
50–60%
60–70%
70–80%
80–90%
Bush
50–60%
60–70%
70–80%
President before election
George W. Bush
Republican
Elected President
George W. Bush
Republican

The 2004 United States presidential election in Maryland took place on November 2, 2004, and was part of the 2004 United States presidential election. Voters chose 10 representatives, or electors to the Electoral College, who voted for president and vice president.

Maryland was won by Democratic nominee John Kerry by a 12.98% margin of victory. Prior to the election, all twelve news organizations considered this a state Kerry would win, or otherwise considered as a safe blue state. The last Republican to carry the state in a presidential election was Bush's father George H. W. Bush in 1988. As of the 2024 election, this is the last time a Republican presidential candidate won more than 40% of the vote in Maryland, the first time a Republican presidential candidate received more than a million votes in Maryland, and the last time a Democratic presidential nominee has failed to both break 60% of the vote and win by more than a 25% margin in Maryland. At the time, Bush's 1,024,703 votes were the most received by a Republican presidential candidate in the state's history, and would remain so until Donald Trump exceeded this figure in 2024.

== Primaries ==
- 2004 Maryland Democratic presidential primary

== Campaign ==
=== Predictions ===
There were 12 news organizations who made state-by-state predictions of the election. Here are their last predictions before election day.

Source	Ranking
D.C. Political Report	Solid D
Cook Political Report	Likely D
Research 2000	Solid D
Zogby International	Likely D
Washington Post	Likely D
Washington Dispatch	Likely D
Washington Times	Solid D
The New York Times	Solid D
CNN	Likely D
Newsweek	Solid D
Associated Press	Solid D
Rasmussen Reports	Likely D

=== Polling ===
Kerry won every pre-election poll. The final 3 poll average showed Kerry leading 52% to 42%.

=== Fundraising ===
Bush raised $4,174,964. Kerry raised $7,553,542, which was 4% of the total money raised by Kerry in 2004.

=== Advertising and visits ===
Neither campaign advertised or visited this state during the fall election.

== Analysis ==
Bush did win most of the counties in Maryland, but he lost the central part of the state (Washington DC suburbs and Baltimore), where most of the population is. The middle section is very urban and includes a large number of African Americans, many of whom are affluent (specifically in the Democratic stronghold of Prince George's County). Bush dominated Western Maryland and the state's Eastern Shore, which are very rural, but he carried only two congressional districts (see below). However, Kerry's margin of victory was slightly less than in 2000, when Gore won by 16.39%. This also marks the first time since 1880 in which Maryland gave a majority of its vote to a candidate that lost both the popular and electoral vote. This was the first time since 1980 that the state voted for the popular vote loser.

== Results ==
2004 United States presidential election in Maryland
Party	Candidate	Running mate	Votes	Percentage	Electoral votes
Democratic Party	John Kerry	John Edwards	1,334,493	55.91%	10
Republican Party	George W. Bush (incumbent)	Dick Cheney (incumbent)	1,024,703	42.93%	0
Populist Party	Ralph Nader	Peter Camejo	11,854	0.50%	0
Libertarian Party	Michael Badnarik	Richard Campagna	6,094	0.26%	0
Green Party	David Cobb	Patricia LaMarche	3,632	0.15%	0
Constitution Party	Michael Peroutka	Chuck Baldwin	3,421	0.14%	0
Write Ins			2,481	0.11%	0
Totals			2,386,678	100.00%	10
Voter turnout (Voting Age population)					59%

=== Results by county ===
County	John Kerry Democratic		George W. Bush Republican		Various candidates Other parties		Margin		Total votes cast
County	#	%	#	%	#	%	#	%	Total votes cast
Allegany	10,576	35.42%	18,980	63.57%	299	1.01%	-8,404	-28.15%	29,855
Anne Arundel	103,324	43.11%	133,231	55.59%	3,112	1.30%	-29,907	-12.48%	239,667
Baltimore	182,474	51.62%	166,051	46.98%	4,954	1.40%	16,423	4.64%	353,479
Baltimore City	175,022	81.95%	36,230	16.96%	2,311	1.09%	138,792	64.99%	213,563
Calvert	15,967	40.58%	23,017	58.49%	367	0.93%	-7,050	-17.91%	39,351
Caroline	3,810	33.55%	7,396	65.13%	150	1.32%	-3,586	-31.58%	11,356
Carroll	22,974	28.95%	55,275	69.66%	1,100	1.39%	-32,301	-40.71%	79,349
Cecil	14,680	38.97%	22,556	59.87%	438	1.16%	-7,876	-20.90%	37,674
Charles	29,354	50.40%	28,442	48.84%	445	0.76%	912	1.56%	58,241
Dorchester	5,411	40.57%	7,801	58.48%	127	0.95%	-2,390	-17.91%	13,339
Frederick	39,503	39.27%	59,934	59.58%	1,157	1.15%	-20,431	-20.31%	100,594
Garrett	3,291	26.36%	9,085	72.77%	108	0.87%	-5,794	-46.41%	12,484
Harford	39,685	35.20%	71,565	63.48%	1,478	1.32%	-31,880	-28.28%	112,728
Howard	72,257	54.00%	59,724	44.63%	1,829	1.37%	12,533	9.37%	133,810
Kent	4,278	46.07%	4,900	52.77%	107	1.16%	-622	-6.70%	9,285
Montgomery	273,936	65.97%	136,334	32.83%	4,955	1.20%	137,602	33.14%	415,225
Prince George's	260,532	81.81%	55,532	17.44%	2,410	0.75%	205,000	64.37%	318,474
Queen Anne's	7,070	32.44%	14,489	66.48%	235	1.08%	-7,419	-34.04%	21,794
Somerset	4,034	44.85%	4,884	54.30%	76	0.85%	-850	-9.45%	8,994
St. Mary's	13,776	36.33%	23,725	62.57%	415	1.10%	-9,949	-26.24%	37,916
Talbot	7,367	39.05%	11,288	59.84%	12	1.11%	-3,921	-20.79%	18,864
Washington	20,387	35.21%	36,917	63.76%	600	1.03%	-16,530	-28.55%	57,904
Wicomico	15,137	40.36%	21,998	58.66%	368	0.98%	-6,861	-18.30%	37,503
Worcester	9,648	38.24%	15,349	60.84%	232	0.92%	-5,701	-22.60%	25,229
Totals	1,334,493	55.91%	1,024,703	42.93%	27,482	1.16%	309,790	12.98%	2,386,678

==== County that flipped from Democratic to Republican ====
- Somerset (largest town: Princess Anne)

=== By congressional district ===
Kerry won six of eight congressional districts.

District	Kerry	Bush	Representative
1st	36%	62%	Wayne Gilchrest
2nd	54%	45%	Dutch Ruppersberger
3rd	54%	45%	Ben Cardin
4th	78%	21%	Albert Wynn
5th	57%	42%	Steny Hoyer
6th	34%	65%	Roscoe Bartlett
7th	73%	26%	Elijah Cummings
8th	69%	30%	Chris Van Hollen

== Electors ==
Technically the voters of Maryland cast their ballots for electors: representatives to the Electoral College. Maryland is allocated 10 electors because it has 8 congressional districts and 2 senators. All candidates who appear on the ballot or qualify to receive write-in votes must submit a list of 10 electors, who pledge to vote for their candidate and their running mate. Whoever wins the majority of votes in the state is awarded all 10 electoral votes. Their chosen electors then vote for president and vice president. Although electors are pledged to their candidate and running mate, they are not obligated to vote for them. An elector who votes for someone other than their candidate is known as a faithless elector.

The electors of each state and the District of Columbia met on December 13, 2004, to cast their votes for president and vice president. The Electoral College itself never meets as one body. Instead the electors from each state and the District of Columbia met in their respective capitols.

The following were the members of the Electoral College from the state. All 10 were pledged for Kerry/Edwards:

1. Norman Conway
2. Delores Kelley
3. Lainey Lebow Sachs
4. Pam Jackson
5. Dorothy Chaney
6. John Riley
7. Wendy Fielde
8. Daphne Bloomberg
9. Tom Perez
10. Gary Gensler

== See also ==
- United States presidential elections in Maryland
- 2004 United States presidential election
- 2004 United States elections
