= Montgomery County, Maryland =

- County
- County of Montgomery
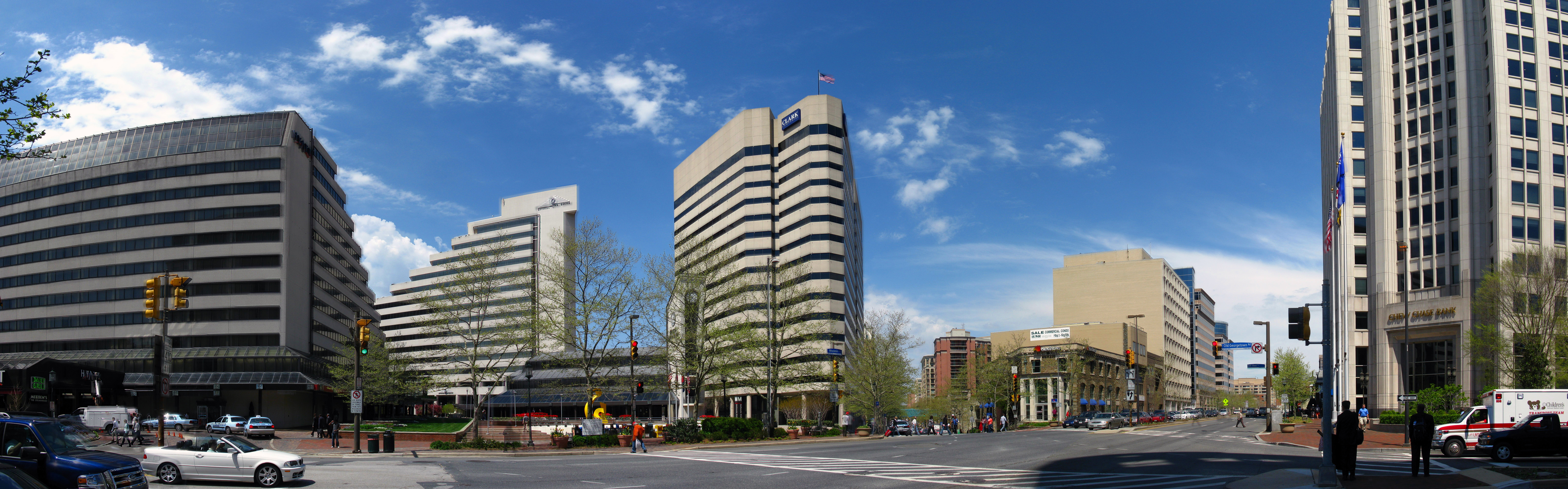
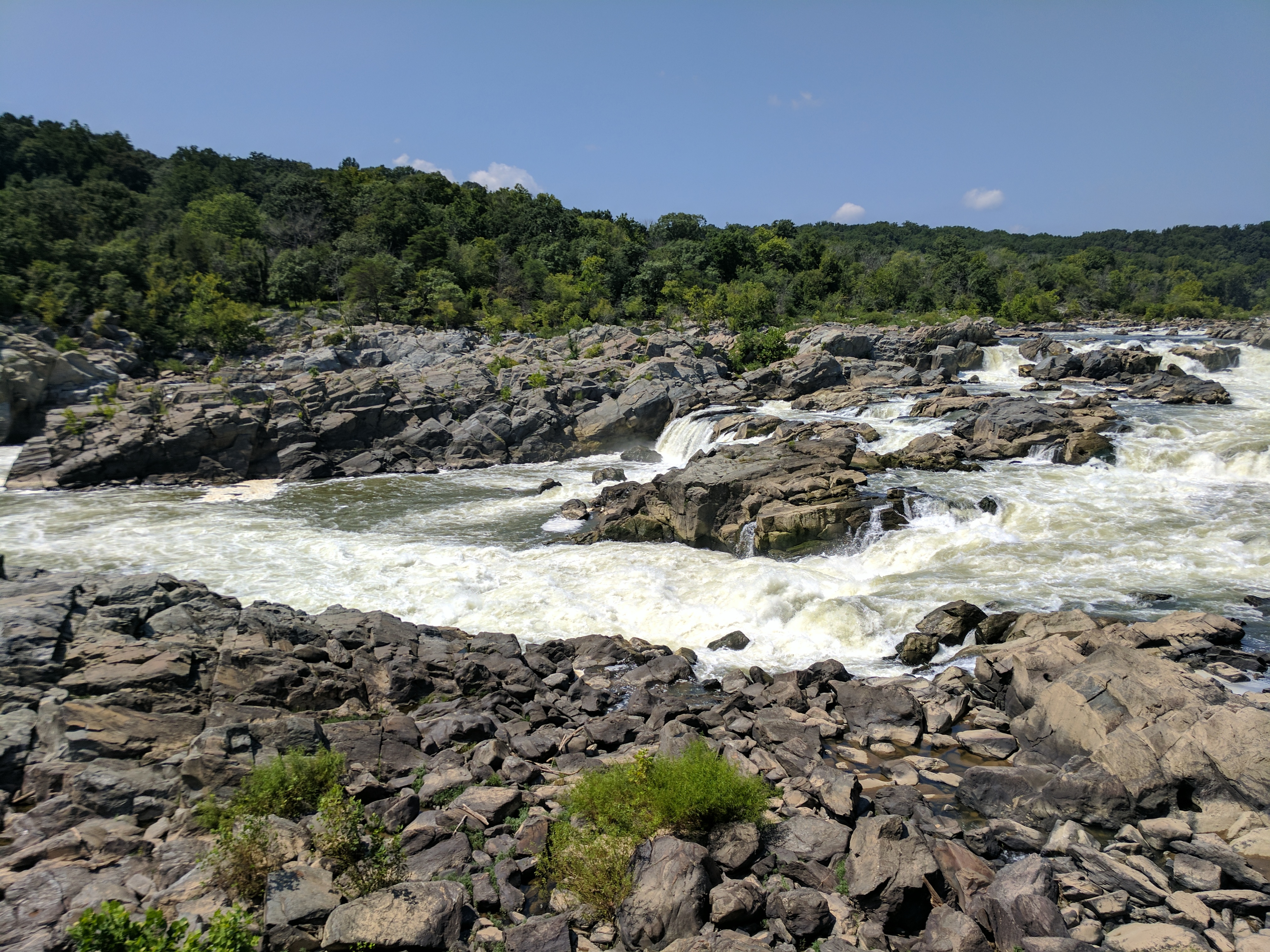
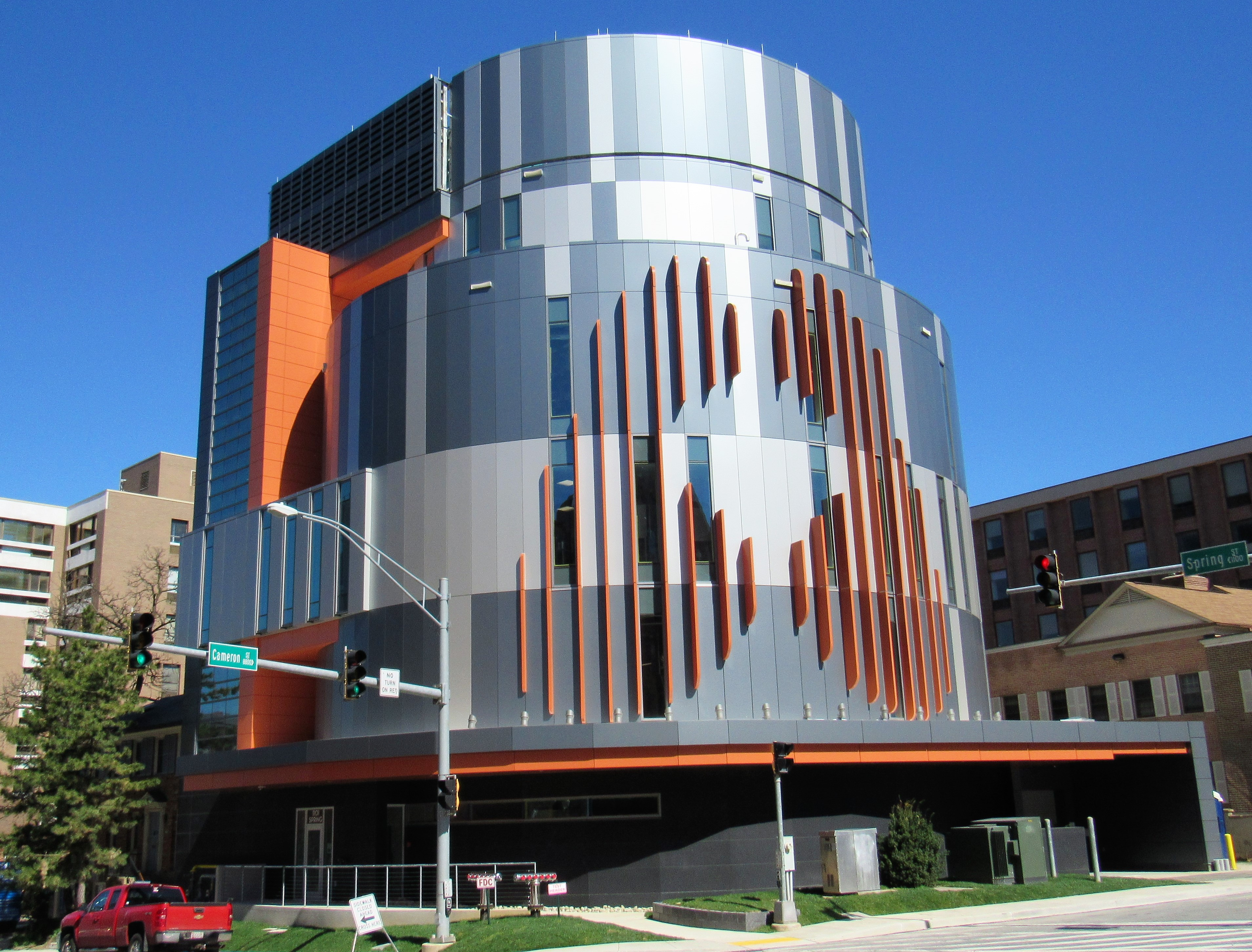
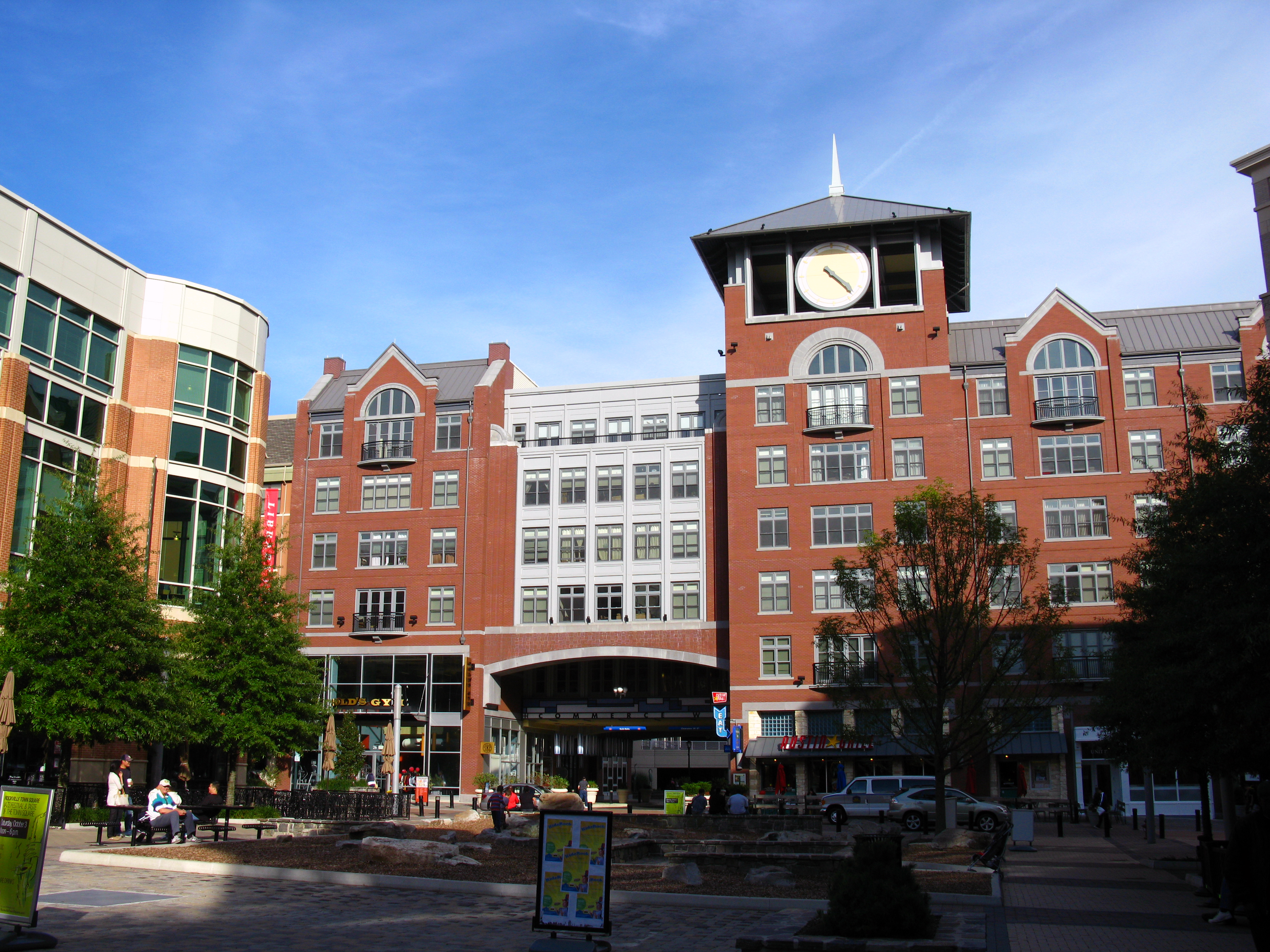
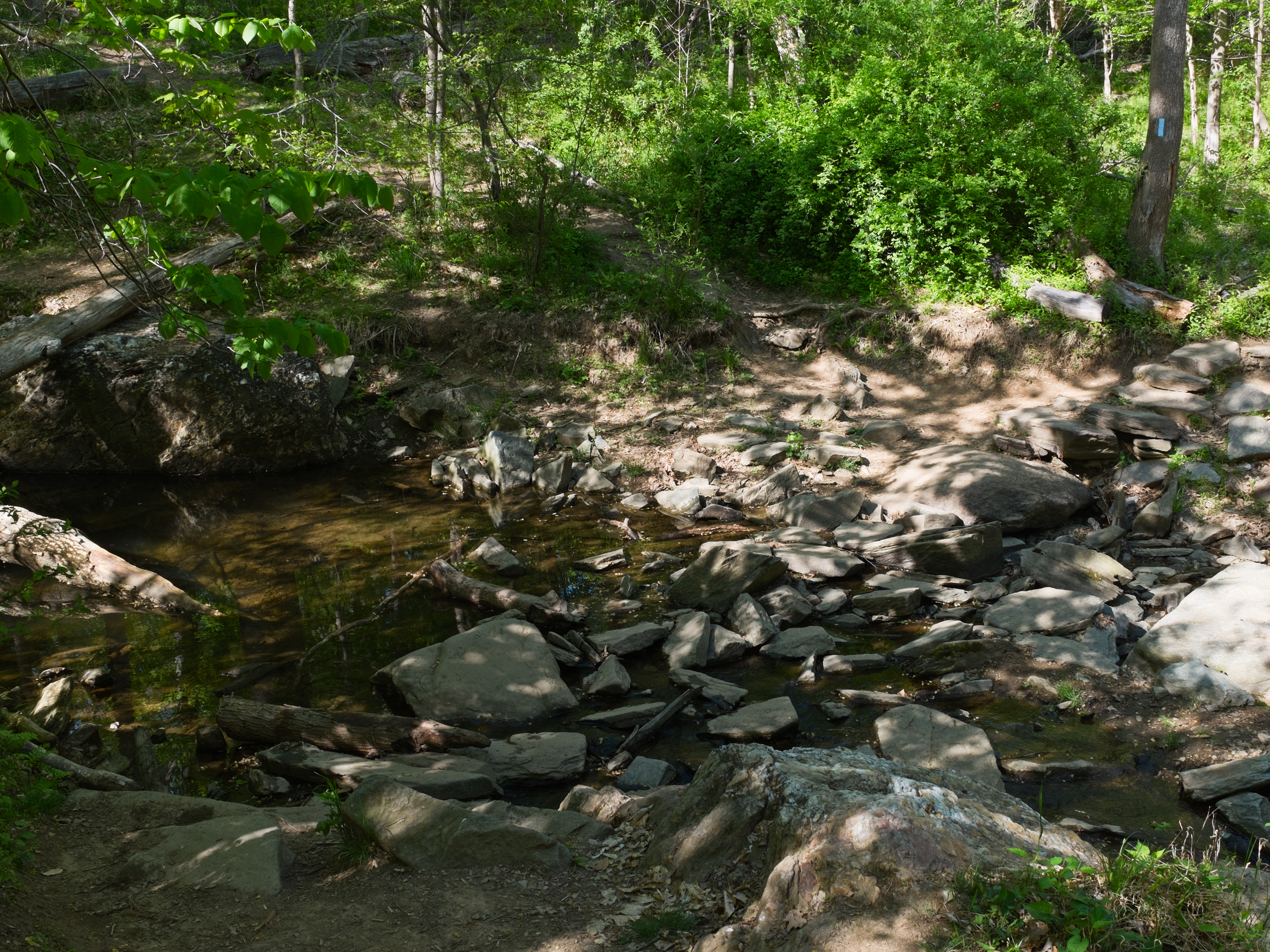
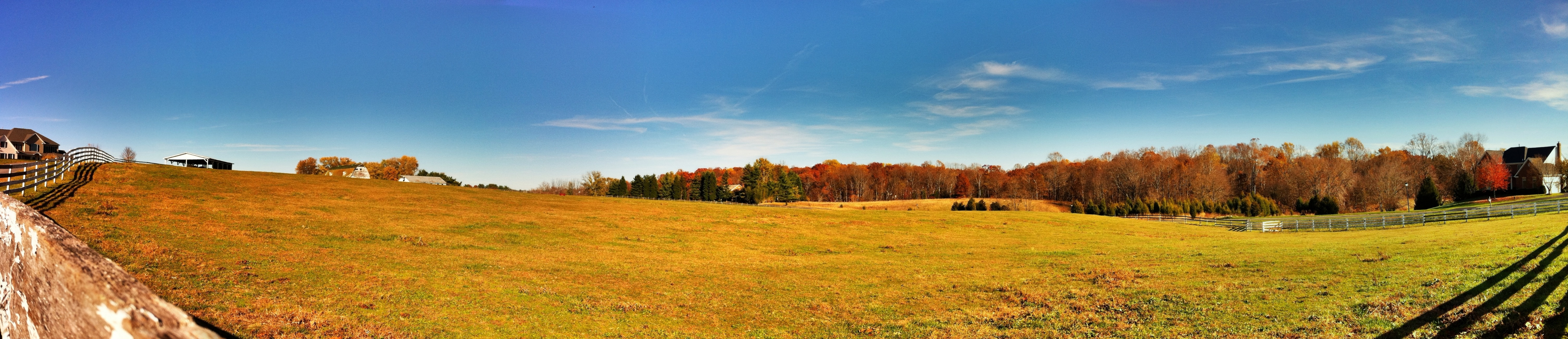
- Clockwise: Downtown Bethesda, Spring Street in Silver Spring, Billy Goat B Trail, rural Darnestown, Rockville town center, Great Falls on the Potomac River

- Flag Seal Coat of arms Emblem
- Nickname: "MoCo"
- Motto: French: Gardez Bien (English: Watch Well)
- Location in the U.S. state of Maryland
- Coordinates: 39°08′11″N 77°12′15″W
- Country: United States
- State: Maryland
- Seat: Rockville
- Largest community: Germantown
- Founded: September 6, 1776
- Named for: Richard Montgomery

Government
  - Executive: Marc Elrich (D)

Area
  - Total: 506.91 sq mi (1,312.89 km^{2})
  - Land: 493.11 sq mi (1,277.15 km^{2})
  - Water: 13.80 sq mi (35.74 km^{2})

Population (2020)
  - Total: 1,062,061
  - Estimate (2025): 1,074,582 ▲
  - Density: 2,153.8/sq mi (831.59/km^{2})
- Demonyms: Montgomery Countyan, MoCoite

GDP
  - Total: $117.390 billion (2024)
- Time zone: UTC−05:00 (Eastern [EST])
  - Summer (DST): UTC−04:00 (EDT)
- ZIP Codes: 20812–20918
- Area codes: 301; 240; 227
- Congressional districts: 4th, 6th, 8th
- Website: www.montgomerycountymd.gov

Montgomery County is the most populous county in the U.S. state of Maryland. As of the 2020 United States census, the county's population was 1,062,061, increasing by 9.3% from 2010. The county seat is Rockville, while its most populous place is Germantown. The county is adjoined to Washington, D.C., the nation's capital, and is part of the Washington metropolitan area and the Washington–Baltimore combined statistical area. Most of the county's residents live in Silver Spring, Bethesda, Germantown, and the incorporated cities of Rockville and Gaithersburg. (Note: Although Gaithersburg is the most populous incorporated city in Montgomery County, Germantown, an unincorporated census-designated place, is the most populous locale in the county.)

The average household income in Montgomery County is the 20th-highest among U.S. counties as of 2020.

The county has the highest percentage (29.2%) of residents over 25 years of age who hold post-graduate degrees. Like other counties in the Washington metropolitan area, the county has several U.S. government offices, scientific research and learning centers, and business campuses.

== Etymology ==
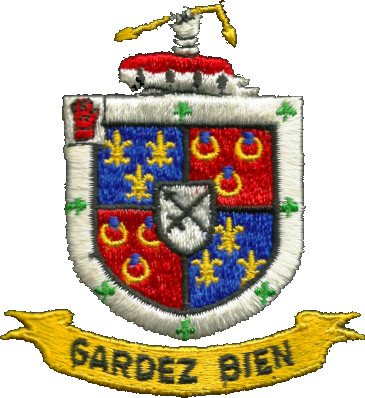
The county coat of arms, used until 1976

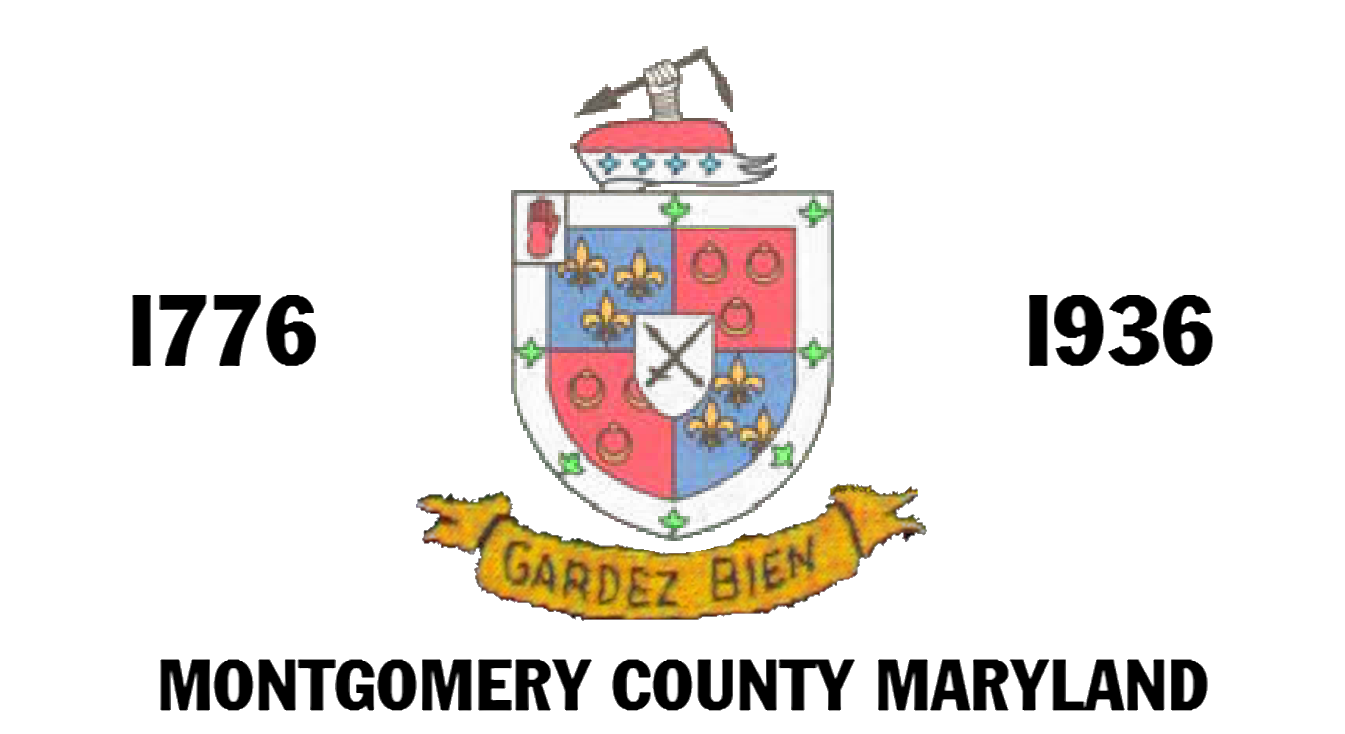
The county flag used from May 3, 1944, to October 5, 1976

The Maryland state legislature named Montgomery County after Richard Montgomery; the county was created from lands that had at one point or another been part of Frederick County. On September 6, 1776, Thomas Sprigg Wootton from Rockville, Maryland, introduced legislation, while serving at the Maryland Constitutional Convention, to create lower Frederick County as Montgomery County. The name, Montgomery County, along with the founding of Washington County, Maryland, after George Washington, was the first time in American history that counties and provinces in the Thirteen Colonies were not named after British referents.

The name use of Montgomery and Washington County were seen as further defiance to Great Britain during the American Revolutionary War. The county's nickname of "MoCo" is derived from "Montgomery County", in use as early as 2001.

The county's motto, adopted in 1976, is "Gardez Bien", a French phrase meaning "Watch Well". The county's motto is also the motto of its namesake's family.

== History ==
Prior to 1688, the first tract of land in what is now Montgomery County was granted by Charles I in a charter to the first Lord Baltimore, the head of the Calvert family. The county's creation was a focus of Thomas S. Wootton who, on August 31, 1776, introduced a measure to form a new county from Frederick County, Maryland to aid area residents in simplifying their business affairs. The measure passed, creating the new political entity of Montgomery County in what was then the colonial-era Province of Maryland.

During the late eighteenth and early nineteenth centuries, Montgomery County was the site of tobacco plantations owned by merchant and politician Robert Peter. Hundreds of black people were enslaved on these plantations.

== Geography ==
Washington–Arlington –Alexandria, DC–VA–MD–WV metropolitan statistical area

According to the U.S. Census Bureau, the county has a total area of 507 square miles (1,310 km^{2}), of which 491 square miles (1,270 km^{2}) is land and 16 square miles (41 km^{2}) (3.1%) is water. Montgomery County lies entirely inside the Piedmont plateau. The topography is generally rolling. Elevations range from a low of near sea level along the Potomac River to about 875 feet in the northernmost portion of the county north of Damascus. Relief between valley bottoms and hilltops is several hundred feet. Earthquakes are rare; the most recent one, on June 24, 2024, had a 1.8 magnitude and was centered near Spencerville, Maryland.

When Montgomery County was created in 1776, its boundaries were defined as "beginning at the east side of the mouth of Rock Creek on Potomac river [sic], and running with the said river to the mouth of Monocacy, then with a straight line to Par's spring, from thence with the lines of the county to the beginning".

The county's boundary forms a sliver of land at the far northern tip of the county that is several miles long and averages less than 200 yards wide. In fact, a single house on Lakeview Drive and its yard is sectioned by this sliver into three portions, each separately contained within Montgomery, Frederick and Howard counties. These jurisdictions and Carroll County meet at a single point at Parr's Spring on Parr's Ridge.

=== Adjacent counties ===
- Frederick County (northwest)
- Carroll County (north)
- Howard County (northeast)
- Prince George's County (southeast)
- Washington, D.C. (south)
- Fairfax County, Virginia (southwest)
- Loudoun County, Virginia (west)

=== National protected areas ===
- Chesapeake and Ohio Canal National Historical Park (part)
- Clara Barton National Historic Site
- George Washington Memorial Parkway (part)

== Climate ==
Montgomery County lies within the northern portions of the humid subtropical climate. It has four distinct seasons, including hot, humid summers and cool winters.

Precipitation is fairly evenly distributed throughout the year, with an average of 43 inches (110 cm) of rainfall. Thunderstorms are common during the summer months, and account for the majority of the average 35 days with thunder per year. Heavy precipitation is most common in summer thunderstorms, but drought periods are more likely during these months because summer precipitation is more variable than winter.

The mean annual temperature is 55 °F (13 °C). The average summer (June–July–August) afternoon maximum is about 85 °F (29 °C) while the morning minimums average 66 °F (19 °C). In winter (December–January–February), these averages are 44 °F (7 °C) and 28 °F (−2 °C). Extreme heat waves can raise readings to around and slightly above 100 °F (38 °C), and arctic blasts can drop lows to −10 °F (−23 °C) to 0 °F (−18 °C). For Rockville, the record high is 105 °F (41 °C) in 1954, while the record low is −13 °F (−25 °C).

Lower elevations in the south, such as Silver Spring, receive an average of 17.5 inches (44 cm) of snowfall per year. Higher elevations in the north, such as Damascus, receive an average of 21.3 inches (54 cm) of snowfall per year. During a particularly snowy winter, Damascus received 79 inches (200 cm) during the 2009–2010 season.

== Demographics ==
Historical population
Census	Pop.	Note	%±
1790	18,003		—
1800	15,058		−16.4%
1810	17,980		19.4%
1820	16,400		−8.8%
1830	19,816		20.8%
1840	15,456		−22.0%
1850	15,860		2.6%
1860	18,322		15.5%
1870	20,563		12.2%
1880	24,759		20.4%
1890	27,185		9.8%
1900	30,451		12.0%
1910	32,089		5.4%
1920	34,921		8.8%
1930	49,206		40.9%
1940	83,912		70.5%
1950	164,401		95.9%
1960	340,928		107.4%
1970	522,809		53.3%
1980	579,053		10.8%
1990	757,027		30.7%
2000	873,341		15.4%
2010	971,777		11.3%
2020	1,062,061		9.3%
2025 (est.)	1,074,582	▲	1.2%
U.S. Decennial Census; 1790–1960 1900–1990; 1990–2000 2010 2020

Since the 1970s, the county has had in place a Moderately Priced Dwelling Unit (MPDU) zoning plan that requires developers to include affordable housing in any new residential developments that they construct in the county. The goal is to create socioeconomically mixed neighborhoods and schools so the rich and poor are not isolated in separate parts of the county. Developers who provide for more than the minimum amount of MPDUs are rewarded with permission to increase the density of their developments, which allows them to build more housing and generate more revenue. Montgomery County was one of the first counties in the U.S. to adopt such a plan, and many other areas have since followed suit.

Montgomery County is by far one of the most ethnically and culturally diverse counties in the United States; four of the ten most culturally diverse cities and towns in the U.S. are in Montgomery County: Gaithersburg, ranking second; Germantown, ranking third; Silver Spring, ranking fourth; and Rockville, ranking ninth. Gaithersburg, Germantown, and Silver Spring all rank as more culturally diverse than New York City, San Jose, and Oakland. Maryland overall is one of nine majority-minority states.

=== 2020 census ===
As of the 2020 census, the county had a population of 1,062,061. The median age was 39.5 years. 22.9% of residents were under the age of 18 and 16.0% of residents were 65 years of age or older. For every 100 females there were 92.1 males, and for every 100 females age 18 and over there were 88.5 males age 18 and over. 97.3% of residents lived in urban areas, while 2.7% lived in rural areas.

The racial makeup of the county was 43.1% White, 18.6% Black or African American, 0.7% American Indian and Alaska Native, 15.4% Asian, 0.1% Native Hawaiian and Pacific Islander, 11.0% from some other race, and 11.2% from two or more races. Hispanic or Latino residents of any race comprised 20.5% of the population.

There were 386,931 households in the county, of which 34.3% had children under the age of 18 living with them and 28.0% had a female householder with no spouse or partner present. About 25.1% of all households were made up of individuals and 10.1% had someone living alone who was 65 years of age or older.

There were 404,423 housing units, of which 4.3% were vacant. Among occupied housing units, 63.7% were owner-occupied and 36.3% were renter-occupied. The homeowner vacancy rate was 0.9% and the rental vacancy rate was 5.5%.

=== Racial and ethnic composition ===
Montgomery County, Maryland – Racial and ethnic composition Note: the US Census treats Hispanic/Latino as an ethnic category. This table excludes Latinos from the racial categories and assigns them to a separate category. Hispanics/Latinos may be of any race.
Race / Ethnicity (NH = Non-Hispanic)	Pop 1980	Pop 1990	Pop 2000	Pop. 2010	Pop. 2020	% 1980	% 1990	% 2000	% 2010	% 2020
White alone (NH)	477,976	548,453	519,318	478,765	430,980	82.54%	72.45%	59.46%	49.27%	40.58%
Black or African American alone (NH)	49,837	89,184	129,371	161,689	192,714	8.61%	11.78%	14.81%	16.64%	18.15%
Native American or Alaska Native alone (NH)	980	1,618	1,756	1,580	1,377	0.17%	0.21%	0.20%	0.16%	0.13%
Asian alone (NH)	22,790	60,972	98,281	134,677	162,472	3.94%	8.05%	11.25%	13.86%	15.30%
Native Hawaiian or Pacific Islander alone (NH)	x	x	351	427	440	x	x	0.04%	0.04%	0.04%
Other race alone (NH)	4,680	1,116	2,630	3,617	8,589	0.81%	0.15%	0.30%	0.37%	0.81%
Mixed race or Multiracial (NH)	x	x	21,030	25,624	48,080	x	x	2.41%	2.64%	4.53%
Hispanic or Latino (any race)	22,790	55,684	100,604	165,398	217,409	3.94%	7.36%	11.52%	17.02%	20.47%
Total	579,053	757,027	873,341	971,777	1,062,061	100.00%	100.00%	100.00%	100.00%	100.00%

=== 2010 census ===
As of the 2010 United States census, there were 971,777 people, 357,086 households, and 244,898 families living in the county. The population density was 1,978.2 inhabitants per square mile (763.8/km^{2}). There were 375,905 housing units at an average density of 765.2 per square mile (295.4/km^{2}). The racial makeup of the county was 57.5% White, 17.2% Black or African American, 13.9% Asian, 0.4% American Indian, 0.1% Pacific islander, 7.0% from other races, and 4.0% from two or more races. Those of Hispanic or Latino origin made up 17.0% of the population. In terms of ancestry, 10.7% were German, 9.6% were Irish, 7.9% were English, 4.9% were Italian, 3.5% were Russian, 3.1% were Polish, 2.9% were American and 2% were French. People of Central American descent made up 8.1% of Montgomery County, with Salvadoran Americans constituting 5.4% of the county's population. Over 52,000 people of Salvadoran descent lived in Montgomery County, with Salvadoran Americans comprising approximately 32% of the county's Hispanic and Latino population. People of South American descent make up 3.8% of the county, with Peruvian Americans being the largest South American community, constituting 1.2% of the county's population.

Of the 357,086 households, 35.7% had children under the age of 18 living with them, 53.4% were married couples living together, 11.3% had a female householder with no husband present, 31.4% were non-families, and 25.0% of all households were made up of individuals. The average household size was 2.70 and the average family size was 3.22. The median age was 38.5 years.

The median income for a household in the county was $93,373 and the median income for a family was $111,737. Males had a median income of $71,841 versus $55,431 for females. The per capita income for the county was $47,310. About 4.0% of families and 6.0% of the population were below the poverty line, including 7.2% of those under age 18 and 6.3% of those age 65 or over.

=== 2000 census ===
As of the 2000 United States census, there were 873,058 people living in the county. The racial makeup of the county was 65.0% white, 15.1% Black or African American, 11.3% Asian, 0.3% American Indian, 0.1% Pacific islander, 5.0% from other races, and 3.5% from two or more races. Those of Hispanic or Latino origin made up 11.5% of the population.

There were 324,565 households, of which 35% had children under the age of 18 living with them, 55.2% were married couples living together, 10.5% had a female householder with no husband present, and 30.9% were non-families. Of all households, 24.4% were made up of individuals, and 7.7% had someone living alone who was 65 years of age or older. The average household size was 2.66 and the average family size was 3.19.

25.4% of the population was under the age of 18, 6.9% from 18 to 24, 32.3% from 25 to 44, 24.2% from 45 to 64, and 11.2% who were 65 years of age or older. The median age was 37 years. For every 100 females, there were 92.1 males. For every 100 females age 18 and over, there were 88.1 males.

In 2000, there were 334,632 housing units at an average density of 675 per square mile (261/km^{2}).

Montgomery County has the tenth-highest median household income in the United States, and the second highest in the state after Howard County as of 2011. The median household income in 2007 was $89,284 and the median family income was $106,093. Males had a median income of $66,415 versus $52,134 for females. The per capita income for the county was $43,073. About 3.3% of families and 4.6% of the population were below the poverty line, including 4.6% of those under age 18 and 4.6% of those age 65 or over.

=== Religion ===
Of Montgomery County's residents, 14% are Catholic, 5% are Baptist, 3% are Methodist, 1% are Presbyterian, 1% are Episcopalian, 1% are part of the Latter Day Saint movement, 1% are Lutheran, 6% are of another Christian faith, 3% are Jewish, 1% follows Islam, and 1% are of an eastern faith. Overall, 41% of the county's residents are affiliated with a religion.

Montgomery County was named the most religiously diverse county in the United States in 2023 by the Public Religion Research Institute's census. Counties were given a diversity index between 0 and 1, with 0 signifying no diversity, and 1 signifying complete diversity. Montgomery County earned a .886, higher than the national average of .615.

Montgomery County has the largest Jewish population in the state of Maryland, accounting for 45% of Maryland Jews. According to the Berman Jewish DataBank, Montgomery County has a Jewish population of 105,400 people, around 10% of the county's population. The Washington metropolitan area, with 295,500 Jews, has become the third-largest Jewish population in the United States.

As of 2020, Montgomery County is home to 776 religious congregations.

== Economy ==
Montgomery County has the largest economy in Maryland by far; its Gross Domestic Product (GDP) of more than $117 Billion makes up 25% of the state’s total economy as of 2024. The county is an important business and research center. It is the epicenter for biotechnology in the Mid-Atlantic region. Montgomery County, as third largest biotechnology cluster in the U.S., holds a large cluster and companies of large corporate size within the state. Biomedical research is carried out by institutions including Johns Hopkins University's Montgomery County Campus (JHU MCC), and the Howard Hughes Medical Institute (HHMI). Federal government agencies in Montgomery County engaged in related work include the Food and Drug Administration (FDA), the National Institutes of Health (NIH), the Uniformed Services University of the Health Sciences (USUHS), and the Walter Reed Army Institute of Research.

Many large firms are based in the county, including Coventry Health Care, Lockheed Martin, Marriott International, Host Hotels & Resorts, Travel Channel, Ritz-Carlton, Robert Louis Johnson Companies (RLJ Companies), Choice Hotels, MedImmune, TV One, BAE Systems Inc., Hughes Network Systems and GEICO.

Other U.S. federal government agencies based in the county include the National Oceanic and Atmospheric Administration (NOAA), Nuclear Regulatory Commission (NRC), U.S. Department of Energy (DOE), the National Institute of Standards and Technology (NIST), the Walter Reed National Military Medical Center (WRNMMC), and the U.S. Consumer Product Safety Commission (CPSC).

Downtown Bethesda and Silver Spring are the largest urban business hubs in the county; combined, they rival many major city cores.

=== Top employers ===
According to the county's comprehensive annual financial reports, the top employers by number of employees in the county are the following. "NR" indicates the employer was not ranked among the top ten employers that year.

Employer	Employees (2021) (Note: In 2021, number of employees was given as a range. The figure shown in this table is the average of the range given.)	Employees (2014)	Employees (2011)	Employees (2005)
U.S. Department of Health and Human Services	27,500	28,500	29,700	38,800
Montgomery County Public Schools	27,500	25,429	22,016	20,987
Montgomery County Government	12,500	10,815	8,849	8,272
U.S. Department of Defense	7,500	12,000	12,690	13,800
Adventist Healthcare	7,500	4,900	5,310	6,000
Holy Cross Hospital of Silver Spring	3,750	3,400	NR	NR
Marriott International Administrative Services	3,750	4,700	5,441	NR
Montgomery College	3,750	3,632	NR	NR
GEICO	3,750	NR	NR	NR
U.S. Department of Commerce	3,750	5,500	8,250	6,200
Lockheed Martin	NR	4,000	4,745	3,900
Nuclear Regulatory Commission	NR	3,840	NR	NR
Giant	NR	NR	3,842	4,900
Verizon	NR	NR	3,292	4,700
Chevy Chase Bank	NR	NR	NR	4,700

== Politics and government ==
Montgomery County Council

Type
- Type: Unicameral
- Term limits: 3 consecutive terms

History
- Founded: 1948
- Preceded by: Montgomery County Board of Commissioners

Leadership
- Council President: Natali Fani-González, Democratic since December 2025
- Council Vice President: Marilyn Balcombe, Democratic since December 2025

Structure
- Seats: 11
- Political groups: Majority (11): Democratic (11)
- Committees: Audit; Economic Development (ECON); Education & Culture (EC); Government Operations and Fiscal Policy (GO); Health and Human Services (HHS); Planning, Housing & Parks (PHP); Public Safety (PS); Transportation & Environment (TE)
- Length of term: Full council elected every 4 years
- Authority: Article I, Charter of Montgomery County
- Salary: Council President: $154,408.18/year; Councilmembers: $140,371.07/year

Elections
- Voting system: First-past-the-post
- First election: November 3, 1948
- Last election: November 8, 2022
- Next election: November 3, 2026
- Redistricting: Recommendations by the legislature-appointed commission, approval by legislature.

Motto
- French: Gardez Bien (English: Watch Well)

Meeting place
- Stella B. Werner Council Office Building

Website
- Council Website

Constitution
- Charter

Rules
- Rules of Proceduce

Montgomery County was granted a charter form of government in 1948.

The present County Executive/County Council form of government of Montgomery County dates to November 1968 when the voters changed the form of government from a County Commission/County Manager system, as provided in the original 1948 home rule Charter. The County Commission/County Manager system was seen as inadequate for the growing population of the county who wanted more services assistance and accountability from the government.

The Montgomery County government had a surplus of $654 million for the fiscal year ending June 30, 2021.

=== County executives ===
The office of the county executive was established in 1970. The first executive was James P. Gleason. The current executive is Marc Elrich, who was sworn in for his first term on December 3, 2018.

County Executive
Position	Name	Party	Hometown	Term
1st	James Gleason	Republican	Rockville	1970–1978
2nd	Charles Gilchrist	Democratic	Rockville	1978–1986
3rd	Sidney Kramer	Democratic	Rockville	1986–1990
4th	Neal Potter	Democratic	Cabin John	1990–1994
5th	Doug Duncan	Democratic	Rockville	1994–2006
6th	Ike Leggett	Democratic	Burtonsville	2006–2018
7th	Marc Elrich	Democratic	Takoma Park	2018–

=== Legislative body ===
The County Council is the legislative branch of Montgomery County. It has eleven members who serve four-year terms. All are elected at the same time by the voters of Montgomery County. As of January 2023, all 11 members on the council are Democrats. The council meets weekly at the county seat of Rockville—the 6th Floor of the Stella B. Werner Council Office Building.

The members of the County Council as of 2026 are:

County Council
Position	Name	Affiliation	District	Neighborhoods	First elected
Member	Andrew Friedson	Democratic	1	Potomac, Bethesda, Chevy Chase	2018
Vice President	Marilyn Balcombe	Democratic	2	Germantown, Clarksburg, Darnestown, Poolesville	2022
Member	Sidney A. Katz	Democratic	3	Gaithersburg, Rockville	2014
Member	Kate Stewart	Democratic	4	Downtown Silver Spring, Takoma Park, Kensington, North Bethesda, Garrett Park, North Chevy Chase	2022
Member	Kristin Mink	Democratic	5	Burtonsville, Four Corners, Cloverly	2022
President	Natali Fani-González	Democratic	6	Wheaton, Glenmont, Aspen Hill, Derwood, Forest Glen Park	2022
Member	Dawn Luedtke	Democratic	7	Damascus, Ashton, Laytonsville, Olney, Montgomery Village	2022
Member	Shebra Evans	Democratic	At-large	Entire county	–
Member	Evan Glass	Democratic	At-large	Entire county	2018
Member	Will Jawando	Democratic	At-large	Entire county	2018
Member	Laurie-Anne Sayles	Democratic	At-large	Entire county	2022

The most recent Republican serving on the Montgomery County Council, Howard A. Denis of District 1 (Potomac/Bethesda), lost re-election in 2006. Since then, all Council members have been Democrats.

=== Law enforcement ===
==== County police ====
The Montgomery County Police Department (MCPD) provides the full spectrum of policing services to the entire county. It was founded in 1922 and is headquartered in Gaithersburg, Maryland. It consists of around 1,300 sworn officers and 650 support personnel, split into 6 districts throughout the county. The department also provides assistance to other nearby departments, such as the Metropolitan Police Department of the District of Columbia and the Prince George's County Police Department, if requested.

==== County sheriff's office ====
The Montgomery County Sheriff's Office (MCSO) is a nationally accredited U.S. law enforcement agency and acts as the enforcement arm of the courts in the county. All of its deputy sheriffs are fully certified law enforcement officials with full authority of arrest. The office was created in July 1777 and is the oldest law enforcement agency in Montgomery County. It is headquartered in Rockville, Maryland. It was nationally accredited in 1995, the first county sheriff's office in Maryland to be so. The MCSO has authorized over 165 employees consisting of sworn law enforcement officers and civilian support staff. The office is headed by the sheriff, who has been elected every four years since the 1920s. The current Sheriff is Maxwell C. Uy (D), elected in 2022. Uy is the 62nd Sheriff and the first Asian American to hold that office.

==== Other agencies ====
The cities of Rockville, Gaithersburg, Takoma Park, and Chevy Chase Village maintain their own police departments to complement MCPD. State Law Enforcement Agencies to include the Maryland State Police, Maryland Transportation Authority Police, Maryland Natural Resources Police, and the Maryland Park Police maintain a presence in the county as well.

=== Budget ===
Montgomery County has a budget of $2.3 billion. Approximately $1.48 billion are invested in Montgomery County Public Schools and $128 million in Montgomery College.

=== Bi-county agencies ===
Montgomery and Prince George's counties share a bi-county planning and parks agency in the Maryland-National Capital Park and Planning Commission (M-NCPPC) and a public bi-county water and sewer utility in the Washington Suburban Sanitary Commission (WSSC Water).

=== LGBTQ bill of rights ===
In October 2020, the Montgomery County Council unanimously passed an ordinance that implemented an LGBTQ bill of rights.

=== Liquor control ===
Montgomery County is an alcoholic beverage control county. Beer and wine may also be sold in private stores.

==== History ====
In December 1933, when prohibition was repealed in the United States, Montgomery County only allowed dispensaries located in Bethesda, Rockville, and Silver Spring to sell alcoholic beverages. The dispensaries then could sell beer and light wine to retailers in the county for resale. The dispensaries were not allowed to sell hard liquor for on-premises consumption. Country clubs were also allowed to sell beer and light wine for on-premises and off-premises consumption.

The first beer-and-wine license in Montgomery County was issued to Fred Salamy for Fred's Country Store. In 1961, the license was transferred to Henry J. Dietle to be used at Hank Dietle's. Hank Dietle's originally opened in 1916 as a general store named Offutt's.

Until 1964, only three restaurants in the county had liquor licenses to serve liquor by the drink. The county stopped issuing liquor licenses to all other restaurants under a law that had existed since Prohibition.

Following a voter referendum, restaurants and bars could apply for county permits to sell liquor by the drink. The dry towns of Kensington, Poolesville, and Takoma Park were allowed to keep their own bans in place.

Anchor Inn in Wheaton was the first establishment to serve liquor in the county under the new law.

=== Other elected positions ===
There are 24 judges of the Circuit Court for Montgomery County, who are appointed by the Governor and elected by the voters to 15 year terms. James A. Bonifant has served as the County Administrative Judge since 2021. Karen A. Bushell (D) was appointed as Clerk of the Circuit Court in 2021, and was elected to a full term in 2022. Joseph M. Griffin (D) has served as the Register of Wills since 1998. John J. McCarthy (D) has served as the State's Attorney since 2007.

=== State representation ===
In the Maryland House of Delegates, Montgomery County is in districts 9A, represented by Chao Wu and Natalie Ziegler; 14, represented by Bernice Mireku-North, Pamela E. Queen, and Anne Kaiser; 15, represented by David Fraser-Hidalgo, Lily Qi, and Linda Foley; 16, represented by Sarah Siddiqui Wolek, Teresa Saavedra Woorman, and Marc Korman; 17, represented by Joe Vogel, Julie Palakovich Carr, and Ryan Spiegel; 18, represented by Emily Shetty, Jared Solomon, and Aaron Kaufman; 19, represented by Charlotte Crutchfield, Bonnie Cullison, and Vaughn Stewart; 20, represented by Jheanelle Wilkins, Lorig Charkoudian, and David Moon; and 39, represented by Gabriel Acevero, Lesley Lopez, and W. Gregory Wims.

In the Maryland Senate, Montgomery County is in districts 9, represented by Katie Fry Hester; 14, represented by Craig Zucker; 15, represented by Brian Feldman; 16, represented by Sara Love; 17, represented by Cheryl Kagan; 18, represented by Jeff Waldstreicher; 19, represented by Benjamin F. Kramer; 20, represented by William C. Smith Jr.; and 39, represented by Nancy J. King.

=== Federal representation ===
In the 119th Congress, Montgomery County is represented in the U.S. House of Representatives by Glenn Ivey (D) of the 4th district, April McClain Delaney (D) of the 6th district, and Jamie Raskin (D) of the 8th district.

Voter registration and party enrollment as of June 2025:
Democratic	408,818	57.96%
Unaffiliated	183,003	25.94%
Republican	102,477	14.53%
Other parties	11,076	1.57%
Total	705,374	100%

Montgomery County is one of the most consistently Democratic counties in Maryland. Before 1928, the County never voted Republican. In total, it has only voted Republican in eight presidential elections. The Democratic presidential candidate has won Montgomery County in every presidential election since 1988. In 2020, Joe Biden won the county with 78% of the vote, and in 2024 Kamala Harris won with 74% of the vote.

United States presidential election results for Montgomery County, Maryland
Year	Republican		Democratic		Third party(ies)	
Year	No.	%	No.	%	No.	%
1892	2,584	41.98%	3,383	54.96%	188	3.05%
1896	3,219	47.02%	3,456	50.48%	171	2.50%
1900	3,354	46.90%	3,677	51.42%	120	1.68%
1904	2,711	46.09%	3,082	52.40%	89	1.51%
1908	2,805	44.70%	3,351	53.40%	119	1.90%
1912	1,675	26.84%	3,501	56.10%	1,065	17.06%
1916	2,913	42.50%	3,805	55.52%	136	1.98%
1920	5,948	47.96%	6,277	50.61%	177	1.43%
1924	5,675	44.01%	6,639	51.49%	580	4.50%
1928	9,318	57.74%	6,739	41.76%	82	0.51%
1932	5,698	36.15%	9,882	62.69%	183	1.16%
1936	10,133	43.06%	13,246	56.29%	153	0.65%
1940	13,831	46.85%	15,177	51.41%	513	1.74%
1944	20,400	57.10%	15,324	42.90%	0	0.00%
1948	23,174	60.34%	14,336	37.33%	897	2.34%
1952	47,805	62.37%	28,381	37.03%	467	0.61%
1956	56,501	57.01%	42,606	42.99%	0	0.00%
1960	62,679	48.70%	66,025	51.30%	0	0.00%
1964	52,554	33.76%	103,113	66.24%	0	0.00%
1968	84,651	44.23%	92,026	48.08%	14,726	7.69%
1972	133,090	56.50%	100,228	42.55%	2,239	0.95%
1976	122,674	48.34%	131,098	51.66%	0	0.00%
1980	125,515	47.16%	105,822	39.76%	34,814	13.08%
1984	146,924	50.00%	146,036	49.69%	910	0.31%
1988	154,191	48.05%	165,187	51.48%	1,518	0.47%
1992	119,705	33.01%	199,757	55.09%	43,151	11.90%
1996	117,730	35.15%	198,807	59.36%	18,361	5.48%
2000	124,580	33.52%	232,453	62.54%	14,655	3.94%
2004	136,334	32.83%	273,936	65.97%	4,955	1.19%
2008	118,608	27.00%	314,444	71.58%	6,209	1.41%
2012	123,353	27.05%	323,400	70.92%	9,239	2.03%
2016	92,704	19.36%	357,837	74.72%	28,332	5.92%
2020	101,222	18.96%	419,569	78.61%	12,952	2.43%
2024	112,637	21.69%	386,581	74.45%	20,003	3.85%

== Transportation ==
=== Roads ===
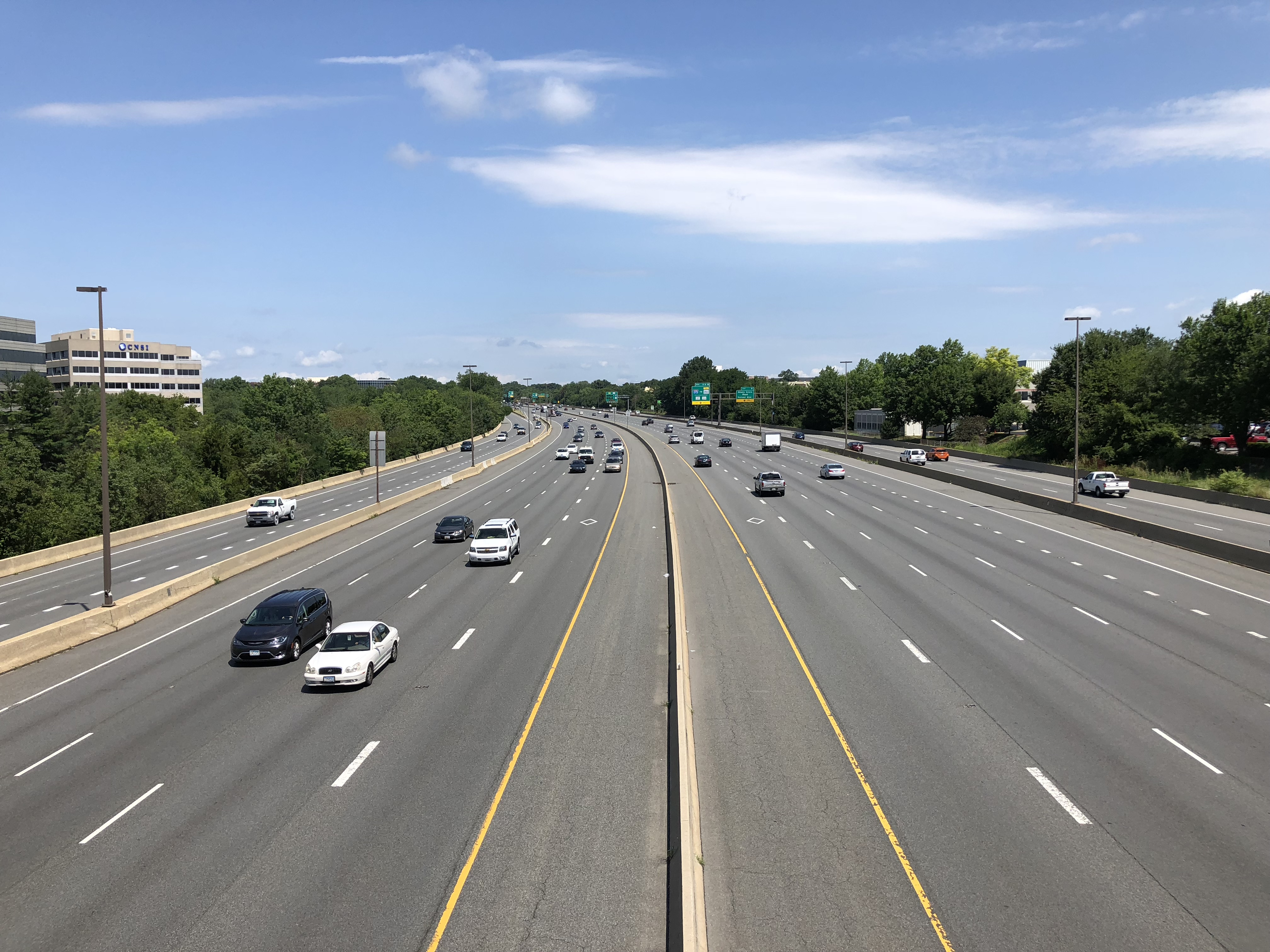
I-270 northbound in Rockville

Poor transportation was a hindrance for Montgomery County's farmers who wanted to transport their crops to market in the early 18th century. Montgomery County's first roads, often barely adequate, were built by the 18th century.

One early road, Maryland Route 355, connected Frederick and Georgetown. There was a road, Maryland Route 190 that connected Georgetown and the mouth of the Monocacy River. Plans to continue the road to Cumberland did not come to fruition. Another road connected the Montgomery County Courthouse with Sandy Spring and Baltimore, and one other road connected the courthouse with Bladensburg and Annapolis.

The county's first turnpike was chartered in 1806, but its construction began in 1817. In 1828, the turnpike was completed, running from Georgetown to Rockville. It was the first paved road in Montgomery County.

In 1849, the Seventh Street Turnpike (now called Georgia Avenue) was extended from Washington to Brookeville. The Colesville–Ashton Turnpike was built in 1870 (now parts of Colesville Road, Columbia Pike, and New Hampshire Avenue).

The United States Army Corps of Engineers built the Washington Aqueduct between 1853 and 1864, to supply water from Great Falls to Washington. The aqueduct was covered in 1875, and it became known as Conduit Road. The Union Arch Bridge, which carries the aqueduct across Cabin John Creek, was the longest single-arch bridge in the world at the time it was completed in 1864. The road is now named MacArthur Boulevard.

==== Major highways and roads ====
- I-270
- I-270 Spur
- I-370
- I-495
- US 29
- MD 27
- MD 28
- MD 80
- MD 97
- MD 107
- MD 108
- MD 109
- MD 112
- MD 115
- MD 117
- MD 118
- MD 119
- MD 121
- MD 124
- MD 182
- MD 185
- MD 186
- MD 187
- MD 188
- MD 189
- MD 190
- MD 191
- MD 198
- MD 200 Toll
- MD 320
- MD 355
- MD 390
- MD 396
- MD 410
- MD 586
- MD 650

=== Bus ===
Montgomery County operates its own bus public transit system, known as Ride On. Major routes closer to its rail service area are also covered by WMATA's Metrobus service.

The county also operates a bus rapid transit (BRT) system named Flash.

The Corridor Cities Transitway is a proposed BRT line that would provide an extension of the Red Line corridor from Gaithersburg to Germantown, and eventually to Frederick County.

=== Rail ===
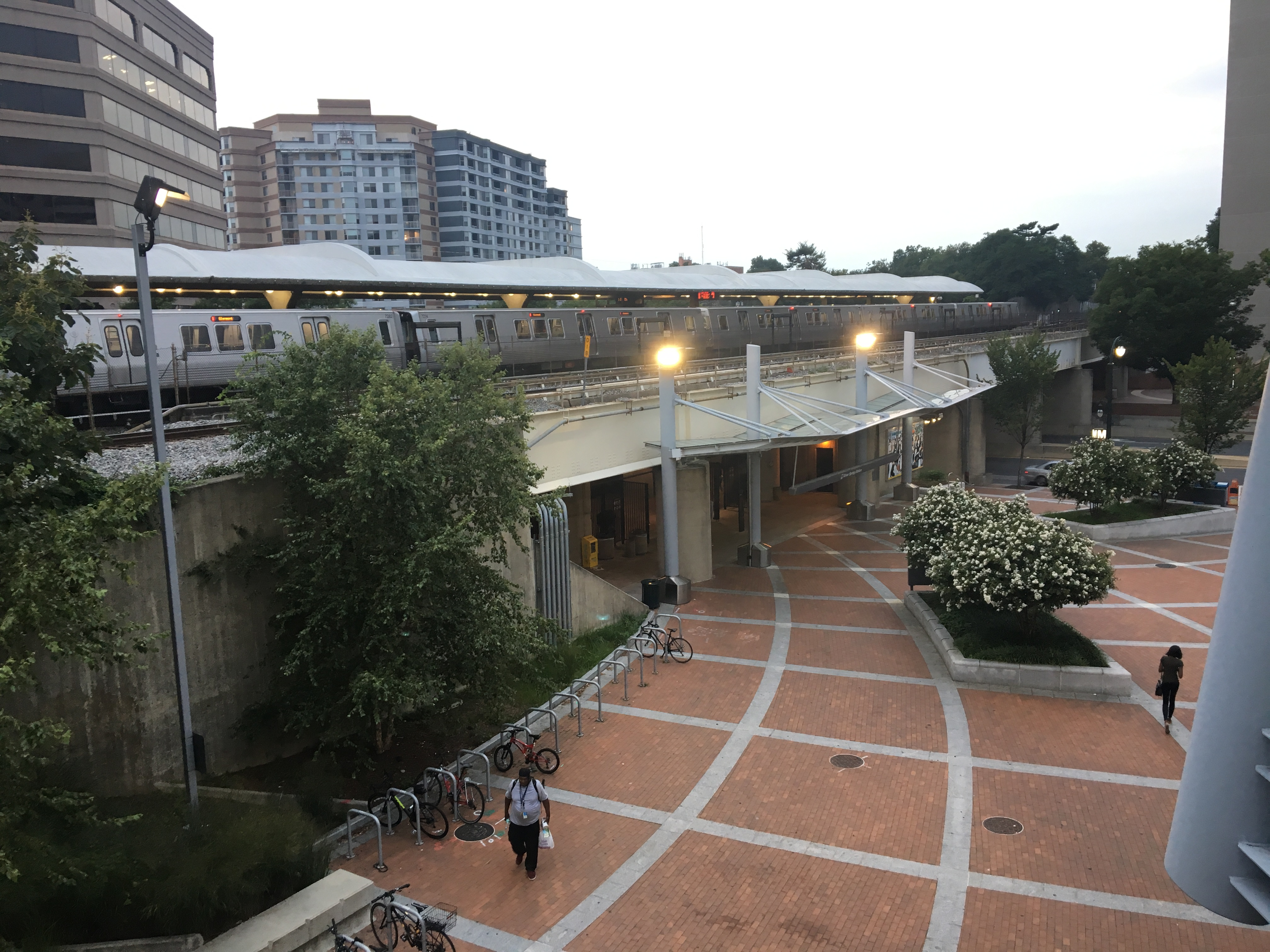
Silver Spring station in August 2017, serving the Red Line of the Washington Metro and serving Amtrak and the Brunswick line of MARC

Montgomery County is served by three passenger rail systems, with a fourth line under construction.

Amtrak, the U.S. national passenger rail system, operates its Capitol Limited to Rockville, between Washington Union Station and Chicago Union Station.

The Brunswick line of the MARC commuter rail system makes stops at Silver Spring, Kensington, Garrett Park, Rockville, Washington Grove, Gaithersburg, Metropolitan Grove, Germantown, Boyds, Barnesville, and Dickerson, where the line splits into its Frederick and Martinsburg branches.

Both suburban arms of the Red Line of the Washington Metro serve Montgomery County. It follows the CSX right of way to the west, roughly paralleling Route 355 from Friendship Heights to Shady Grove. The eastern side runs between the two tracks of the CSX right of way from Washington Union Station to Silver Spring, and roughly parallels Georgia Avenue, from Silver Spring to Glenmont.

The Purple Line, a light rail system, is currently under construction and is scheduled to open in 2027. The line will run in a generally east-west direction, connecting Montgomery and Prince George's Counties near the Beltway, with 21 stations. The Purple Line will connect directly with four Metro stations, MARC trains and Amtrak.

=== Air ===
The Montgomery County Airpark (FAA GAI, ICAO KGAI), a general aviation facility in Gaithersburg, is the major airport in the county. Davis Airport (FAA Identifier W50), a privately owned airstrip, is located in Laytonsville on Hawkins Creamery Road. Commercial air service is provided at the nearby Ronald Reagan Washington National, Washington Dulles International, and BWI Airports.

== Education ==
Education in the county is provided by Montgomery County Public Schools, Montgomery College and other institutions.

=== Montgomery County Public Schools ===
Elementary and secondary public schools are operated by the Montgomery County Public Schools (MCPS). The county public school system is the largest school district in Maryland, serving about 162,000 students with 13,000 teachers and 10,000 support staff. The public school system operating budget for Fiscal Year 2019 was $2.6 billion (~$3.23 billion in 2025).

MCPS operates under the jurisdiction of an elected board of education. Its current members are:

Name	District	Term ends
Brenda Wolff	District 5	2026
Karla Silvestre	At-Large, President	2026
Grace Rivera-Oven	District 1	2026
Shebra L. Evans	District 4, Vice President	2024
Lynne Harris	At-Large	2024
Julie Yang	District 3	2026
Rebecca Smondrowski	District 2	2024
Anuva Maloo	Student Member	2026
Thomas Taylor	Superintendent	2028

MCPS conducted its first 'data deletion week' in 2019, purging its databases of unnecessary student information. Parents said they hoped to shield children from being held accountable in adulthood for youthful mistakes, as well as to guard them from exploitation by what one parent termed "the student data surveillance industrial complex".The district also requires tech companies to annually delete data they collect on schoolchildren. In December 2019 it said GoGuardian had sent formal certification that it had deleted its data, but the district was still waiting for confirmation from Google.

=== Montgomery College ===
The county is also served by Montgomery College, a public, open access community college that had a budget of US$315 million for FY2020. The county has no public university of its own, but the state university system does operate a facility called Universities at Shady Grove in Rockville that provides access to baccalaureate and Master's level programs from several of the state's public universities.

=== Montgomery County Public Libraries ===
The Montgomery County Public Libraries (MCPL) system includes 23 individual libraries, and had a budget $38 million (~$50.4 million in 2025) for 2015.

== Culture ==
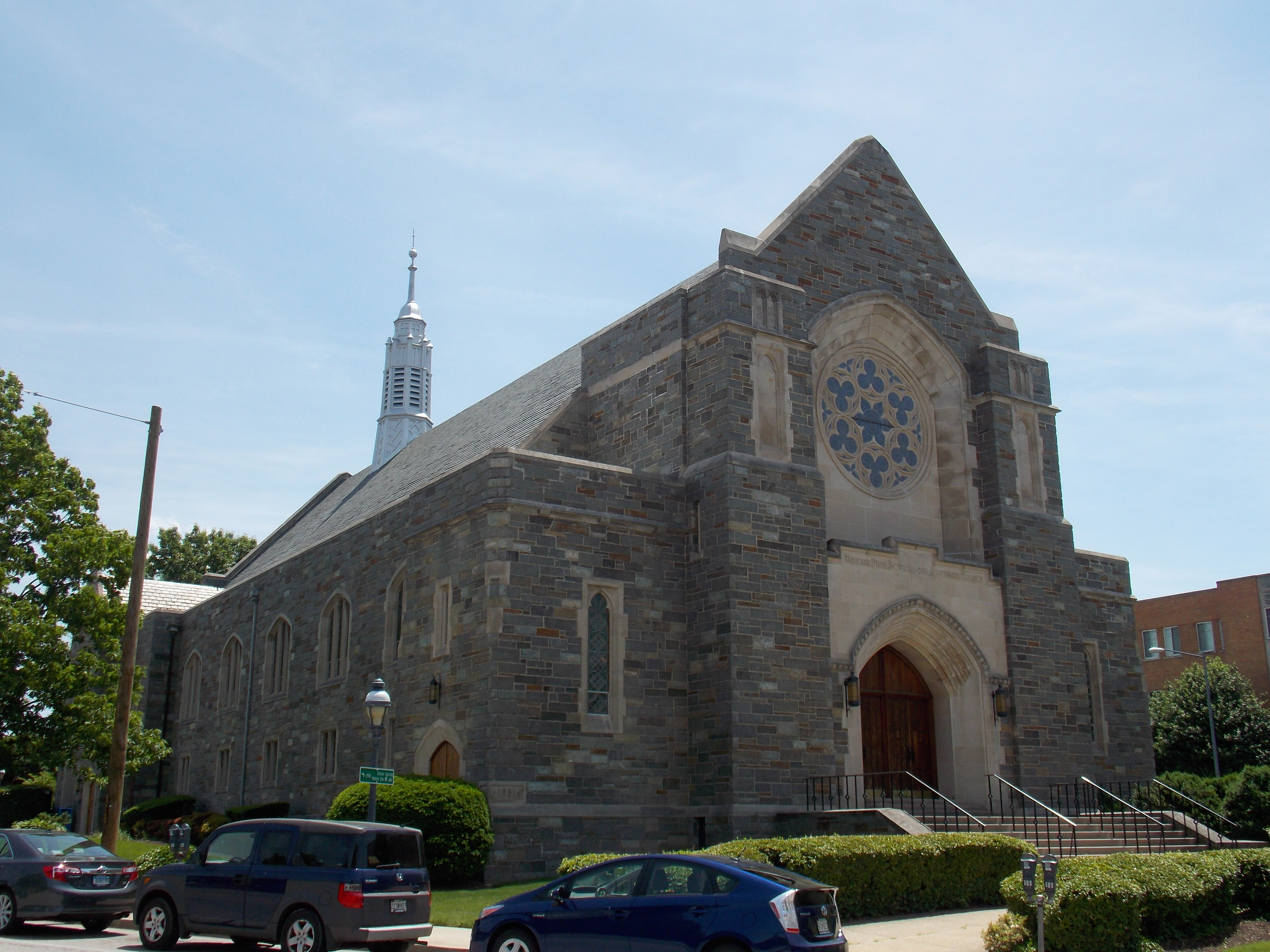
Takoma Park Seventh-day Adventist Church

=== Religion ===
Montgomery County is religiously diverse. In 2010, Montgomery County's population, according to the Association of Religion Data Archives, was 13% Catholic, 5% Baptist, 4% Evangelical Protestant, 3% Jewish, 3% Methodist/Pietist, 2% Adventist, 2% Presbyterian, 1% Episcopalian/Anglican, 1% Mormon, 1% Muslim, 1% Lutheran, 1% Eastern Orthodox, 1% Pentecostal, 1% Buddhist, and 1% Hindu. (Note: These figures count adherents, meaning all full members, their children, and others who regularly attend services. In all of Montgomery County, 40% of the population is adherent to any particular religion.)

In 2020, Montgomery County's congregation members, according to the Association of Religion Data Archives, was 27.7% Catholic, 8.7% Evangelical Protestant, 6.1% Mainline Protestant, 3.1% Muslim, 2.5% Jewish, 1.2% Latter Day Saints, 1.1% Hindus, 0.8% Buddhist, 0.8% Orthodox Christian, 0.7% Jehovah's Witness, 0.4% Black Protestant, 0.3% Other Christian, and 0.1% Other.

Montgomery County was named the most religiously diverse county in the United States in 2023 by the Public Religion Research Institute's census. Counties were given a diversity index between 0 and 1, with 0 signifying no diversity, and 1 signifying complete diversity. Montgomery County earned a .886, higher than the national average of .615.

The Seventh-day Adventist Church maintains its General Conference headquarters in Silver Spring in Montgomery County.

According to the 2020 ARDA census, there are 776 religious congregations. Their tradition and adherents are listed below, however not all religious bodies reported their adherents, so they are estimates.

Tradition	Congregations	Adherents
Black Protestant	19	4,102
Buddhist	20	8,489
Catholic	40	293,819
Evangelical Protestant	504	92,292
Hindu	18	11,493
Islam	12	33,394
Jehovah's Witness	29	7,442
Judaism	47	26,465
Latter Day Saints	21	12,390
Mainline Protestants	171	64,508
Orthodox Christians	19	8,374
Others (Jain, Sikh, Baha'i, Zoroastrian)	16	978
Other Christians	13	3,226

=== Sports ===
From 2013 through 2020, the county was home to the National Women's Soccer League team Washington Spirit, a professional soccer team that played its home games at the Maryland SoccerPlex sports complex in Boyds.

Private country clubs in the county include Bethesda's Congressional Country Club, which has hosted four major championships, including three U.S. Opens, most recently the 2011 event won by Rory McIlroy. The club also hosts the annual Quicken Loans National, a PGA Tour event that benefits the Tiger Woods Foundation. Neighboring TPC at Avenel used to host the Booz Allen Classic.

The Bethesda Big Train, Rockville Express, and Silver Spring–Takoma Thunderbolts play college-level wooden-bat baseball in the Cal Ripken Collegiate Baseball League.

=== Montgomery County Agricultural Fair ===
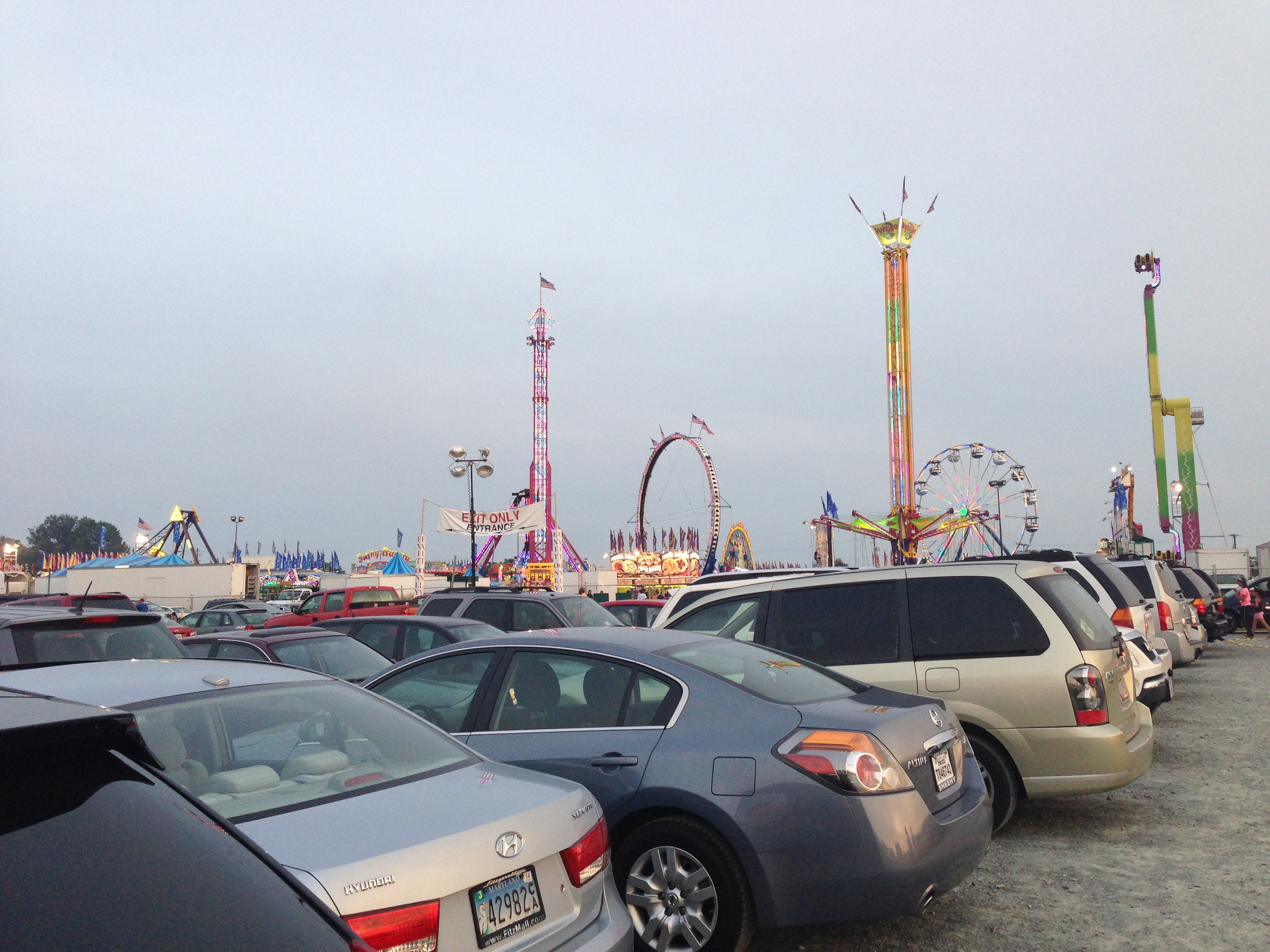
Montgomery County Fairgrounds

The Montgomery County Agricultural Fair, mounted annually since 1949 in Gaithersburg, is the largest farm show in the state. The event includes family events, carnival rides, animals, entertainment, and food. County farmers compete with displays of livestock, produce, canned and baked goods, clothing, and quilts.

=== Sister cities ===
Montgomery County maintains sister city agreements with:

- Morazán Department, El Salvador
- Gondar, Ethiopia
- Xi'an, China
- Hyderabad, India
- Daejeon, South Korea

== Communities ==
=== Cities ===
Cities in Montgomery County

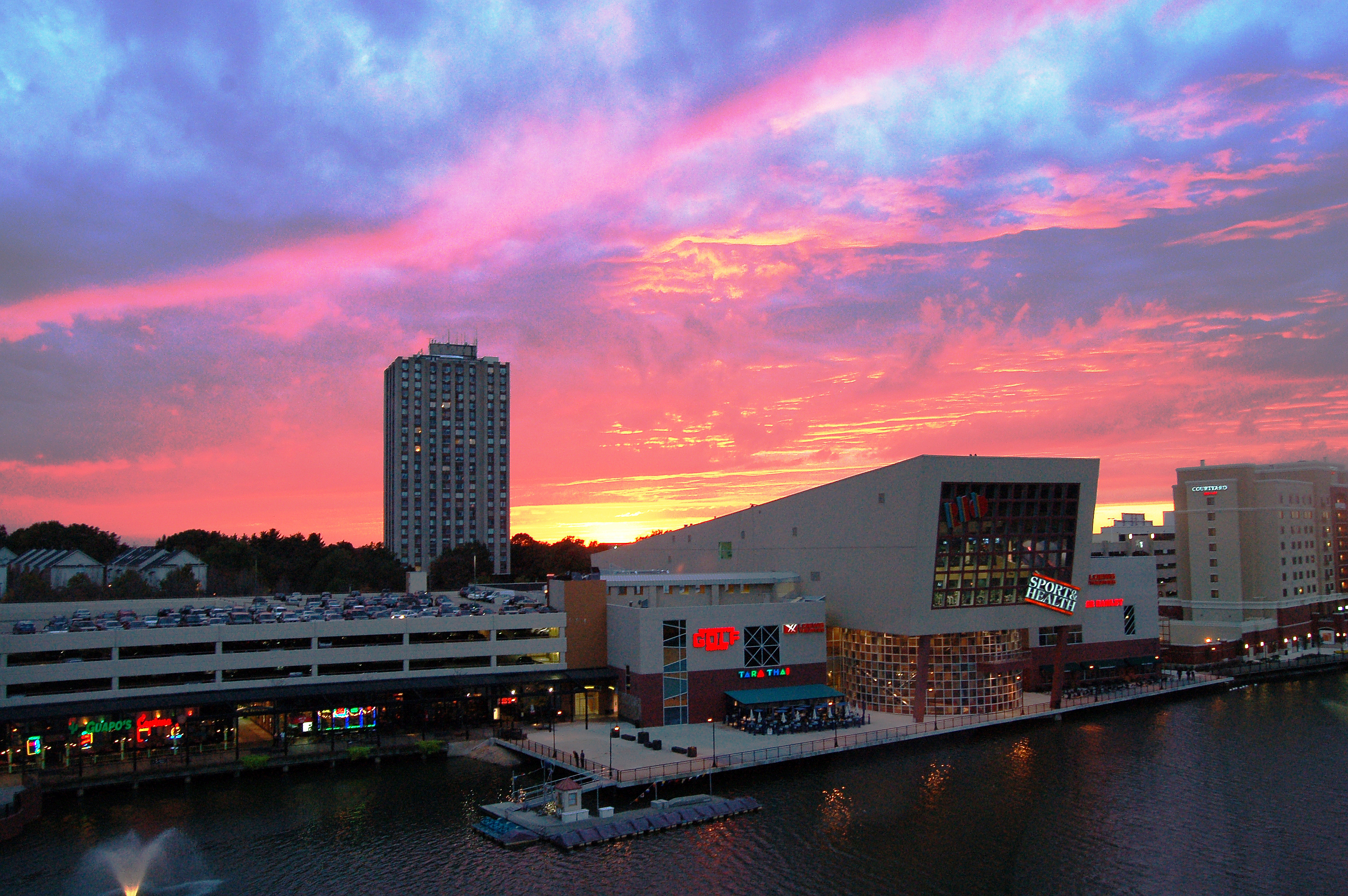
Gaithersburg

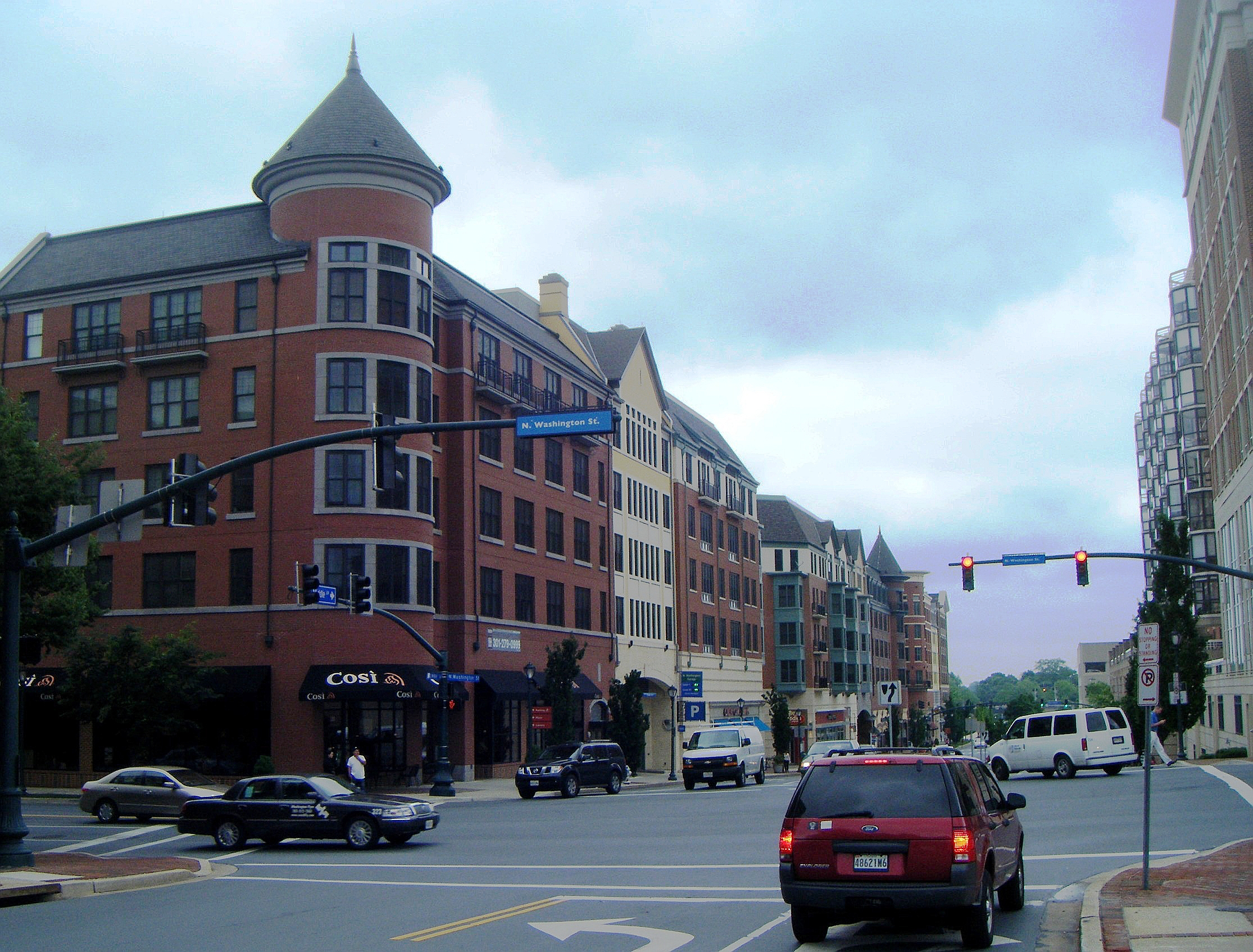
Rockville

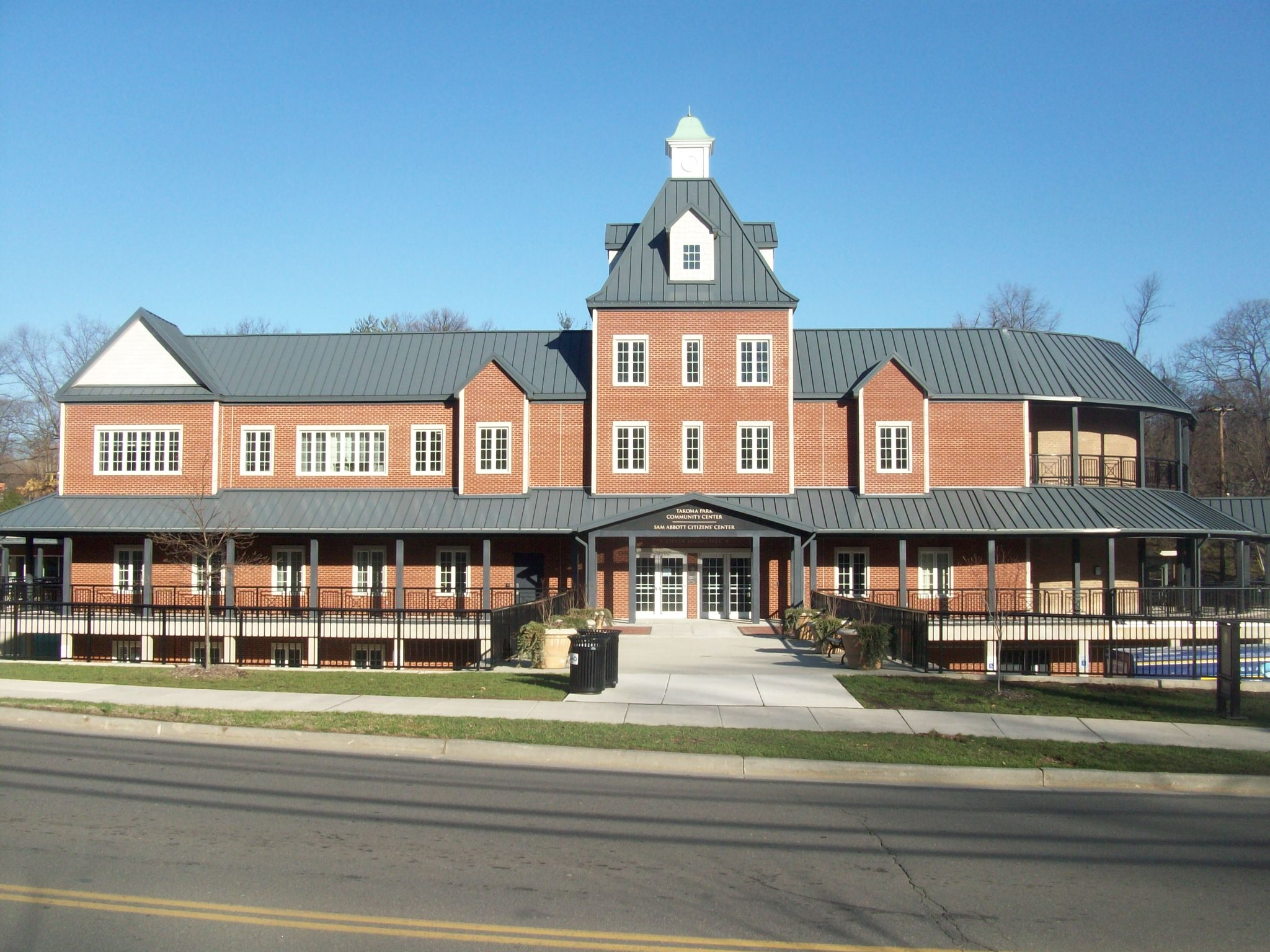
Takoma Park

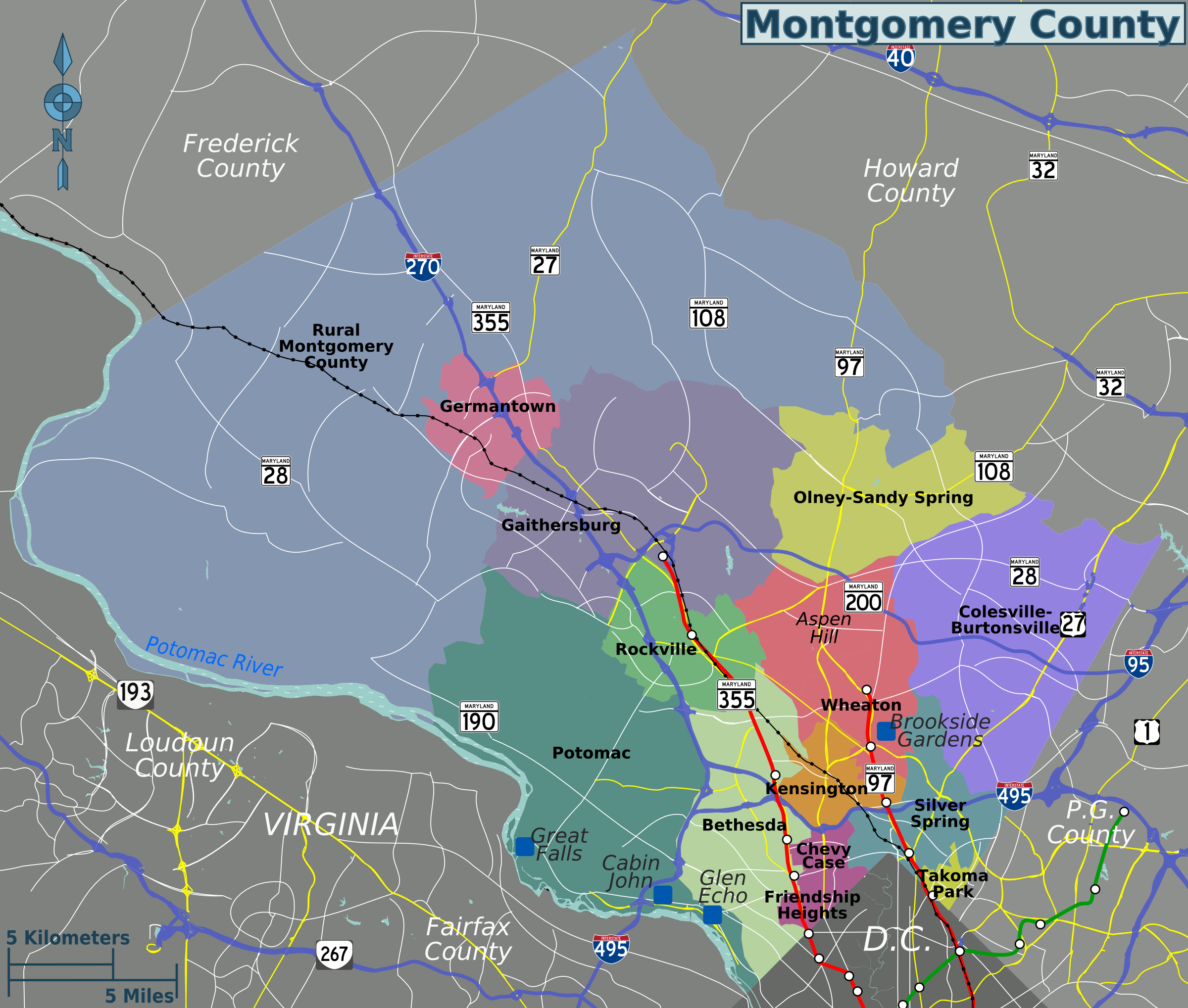
Montgomery County map

- Gaithersburg
- Rockville (county seat)
- Takoma Park

=== Towns ===
- Barnesville
- Brookeville
- Chevy Chase
- Chevy Chase View
- Chevy Chase Village
- Garrett Park
- Glen Echo
- Kensington
- Laytonsville
- Poolesville
- Somerset
- Washington Grove

=== Villages ===
- Chevy Chase, Village of, Section 3
- Chevy Chase, Village of, Section 5
- Martin's Additions
- North Chevy Chase

=== Special Tax Districts ===
Occupying a middle ground between incorporated and unincorporated areas are Special Tax Districts, quasi-municipal unincorporated areas created by legislation passed by either the Maryland General Assembly or the county. The Special Tax Districts generally have limited purposes, such as providing some municipal services or improvements to drainage or street lighting. Special Tax Districts lack home rule authority and must petition their cognizant governmental entity for changes affecting the authority of the district. The four incorporated villages of Montgomery County and the town of Chevy Chase View were originally established as Special Tax Districts. Four Special Tax Districts remain in the county:

- Drummond
- Oakmont

=== Census-designated places ===
Census-designated places

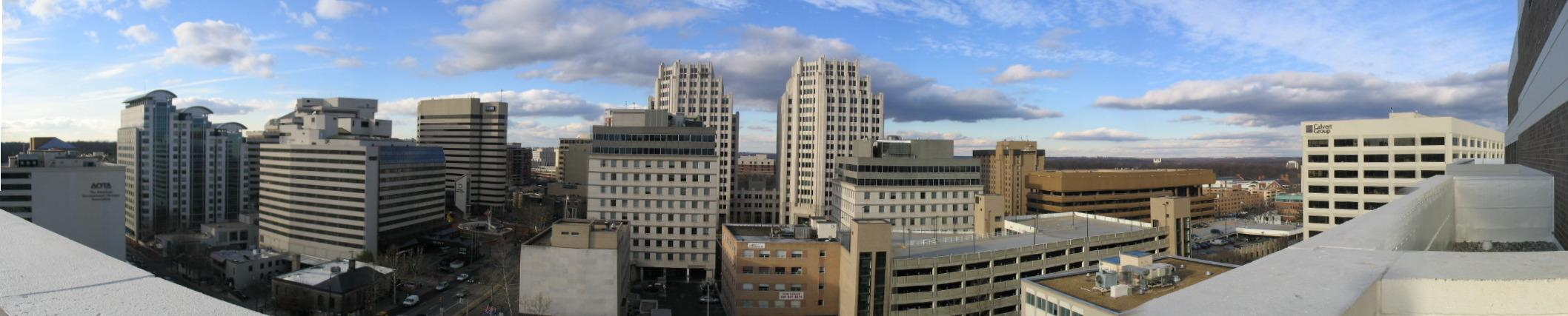
Bethesda

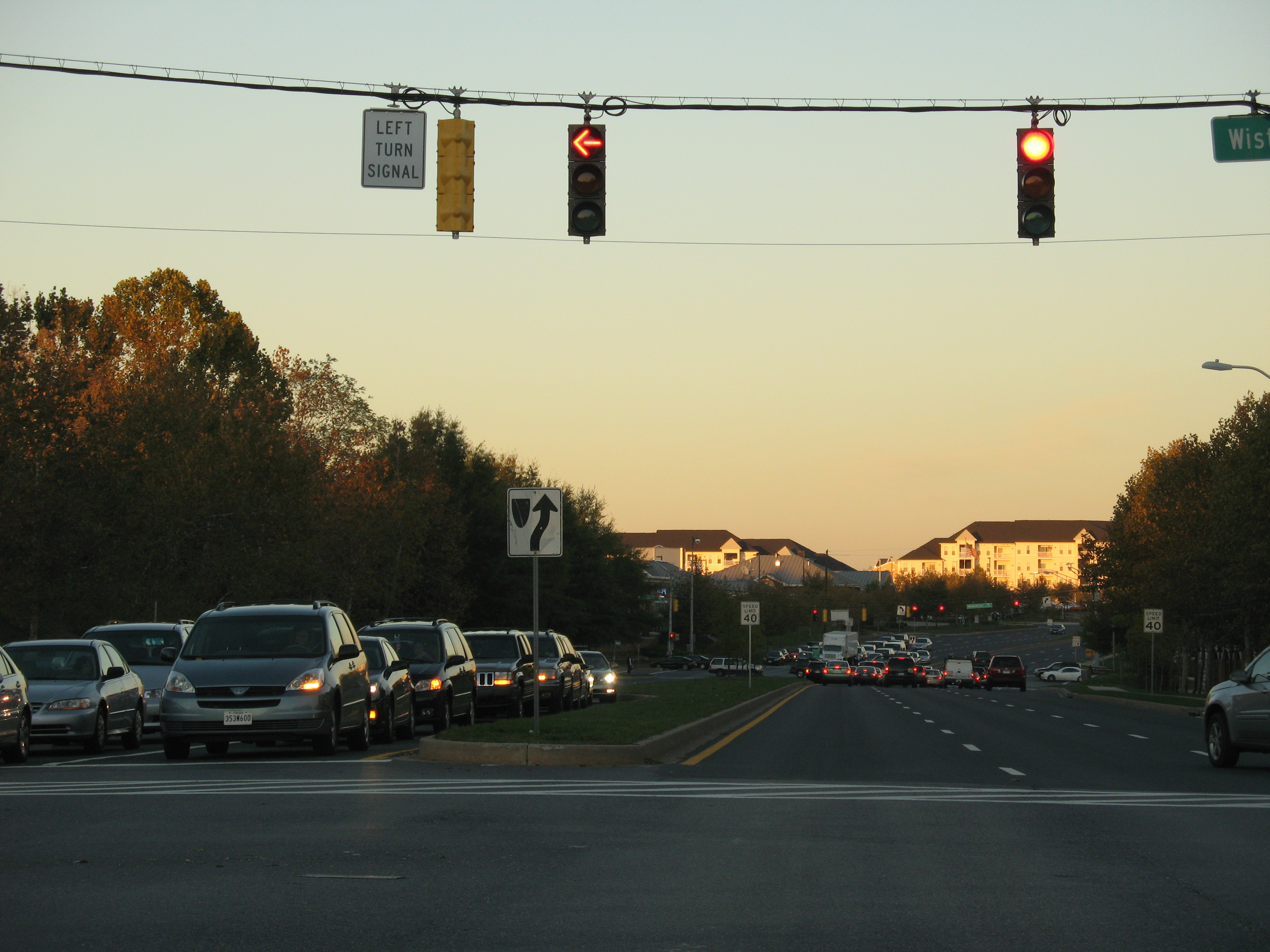
Germantown

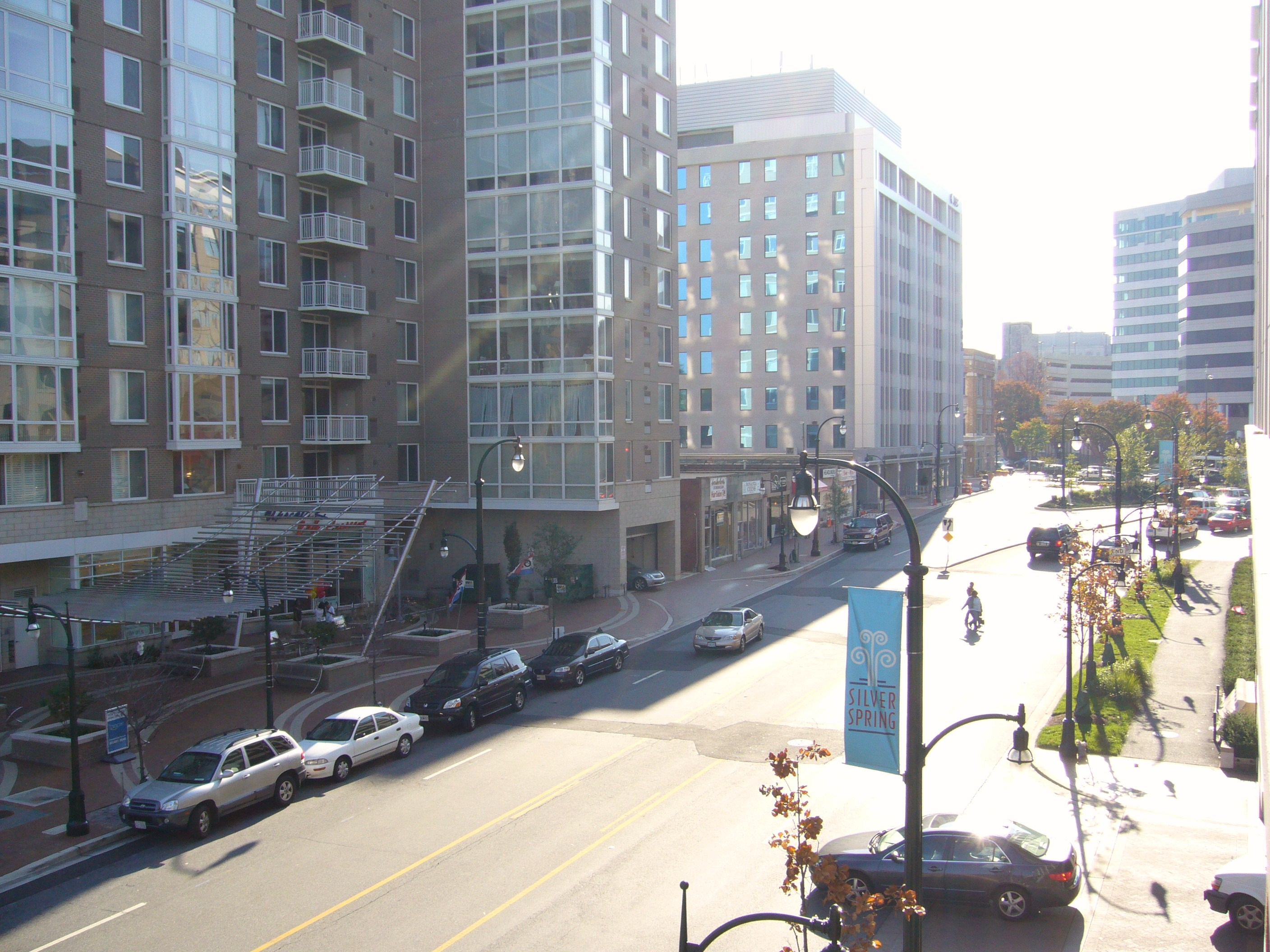
Silver Spring

Unincorporated areas are also considered as towns by many people and listed in many collections of towns, but they lack local government. Various organizations, such as the United States Census Bureau, the United States Postal Service, and local chambers of commerce, define the communities they wish to recognize differently, and since they are not incorporated, their boundaries have no official status outside the organizations in question. The Census Bureau recognizes the following census-designated places in the county:

- Ashton-Sandy Spring
- Aspen Hill
- Bethesda
- Brookmont
- Burnt Mills
- Burtonsville
- Cabin John
- Calverton (partly in Prince George's County)
- Chevy Chase
- Clarksburg
- Cloverly
- Colesville
- Damascus
- Darnestown
- Derwood
- Fairland
- Flower Hill
- Forest Glen
- Four Corners
- Germantown
- Glenmont
- Hillandale (partly in Prince George's County)
- Kemp Mill
- Layhill
- Leisure World
- Montgomery Village
- North Bethesda
- North Potomac
- Olney
- Potomac
- Redland
- Silver Spring
- South Kensington
- Travilah
- Wheaton
- White Oak

=== Unincorporated communities ===
- Ashton
- Beallsville
- Boyds
- Dickerson
- Hyattstown
- Sandy Spring

== See also ==
- Flag of Montgomery County, Maryland
- Montgomery County, Maryland Agricultural Reserve
- National Register of Historic Places listings in Montgomery County, Maryland
