= 1988 United States presidential election in Maryland =

- November 8, 1988
- Turnout: 75.64%

Nominee	George H. W. Bush	Michael Dukakis
Party	Republican	Democratic
Home state	Texas	Massachusetts
Running mate	Dan Quayle	Lloyd Bentsen
Electoral vote	10	0
Popular vote	876,167	826,304
Percentage	51.11%	48.20%
County results
Bush
50–60%
60–70%
70–80%
Dukakis
50–60%
60–70%
70–80%
President before election
Ronald Reagan
Republican
Elected President
George H. W. Bush
Republican

The 1988 United States presidential election in Maryland took place on November 8, 1988, as part of the 1988 United States presidential election. Voters chose 10 representatives, or electors to the Electoral College, who voted for president and vice president.

Maryland was narrowly won by Vice President George H.W. Bush (R-Texas), with 51.11% of the popular vote, over Massachusetts Governor Mike Dukakis (D-Massachusetts) with 48.20% of the popular vote. Bush ultimately won the national vote, defeating Governor Dukakis.

As of 2024, this remains the last time that the Republican presidential candidate has won the state of Maryland, as well as Baltimore County and Howard County. Maryland was one of only two states that Bush carried in 1988 which had voted for Jimmy Carter in 1980, the other being Carter's home state of Georgia. This also marks the only occasion since 1952 in which Maryland has given an outright majority to a non-incumbent Republican.

Maryland weighed in for this election as almost 5% more Democratic than the nation-at-large.

As of 2025, this is the last presidential election in which Maryland voted to the right of neighboring West Virginia and neighboring Pennsylvania. This is also the only presidential election since 1952 in which Maryland voted Republican while West Virginia voted Democratic.

== Results ==
1988 United States presidential election in Maryland
Party	Candidate	Votes	Percentage	Electoral votes
Republican	George H. W. Bush	876,167	51.11%	10
Democratic	Mike Dukakis	826,304	48.20%	0
Libertarian	Ron Paul	6,748	0.39%	0
New Alliance	Lenora Fulani	5,115	0.29%	0
N/A	Write-ins	24	<0.01%	0
Totals		1,714,358	100.0%	10

=== Results by county ===
County	George H.W. Bush Republican		Michael Dukakis Democratic		Various candidates Other parties		Margin		Total votes cast
County	#	%	#	%	#	%	#	%	Total votes cast
Allegany	17,462	59.19%	11,844	40.15%	197	0.66%	5,618	19.04%	29,503
Anne Arundel	98,540	63.53%	55,440	35.74%	1,121	0.73%	43,100	27.79%	155,101
Baltimore	163,881	57.04%	121,570	42.32%	1,844	0.64%	42,311	14.72%	287,295
Baltimore City	59,089	25.43%	170,813	73.51%	2,465	1.06%	-111,724	-48.08%	232,367
Calvert	10,956	62.98%	6,376	36.65%	65	0.37%	4,580	26.33%	17,397
Caroline	4,661	65.44%	2,440	34.26%	22	0.30%	2,221	31.18%	7,123
Carroll	31,224	71.37%	12,368	28.27%	155	0.36%	18,856	43.10%	43,747
Cecil	13,224	62.51%	7,807	36.90%	124	0.59%	5,417	25.61%	21,155
Charles	20,828	63.57%	11,823	36.09%	113	0.34%	9,005	27.48%	32,764
Dorchester	6,343	62.55%	3,709	36.58%	88	0.87%	2,634	25.97%	10,140
Frederick	32,575	65.32%	17,061	34.21%	231	0.47%	15,514	31.11%	49,867
Garrett	6,665	71.81%	2,557	27.55%	60	0.64%	4,108	44.26%	9,282
Harford	38,493	65.73%	19,803	33.81%	270	0.46%	18,690	31.92%	58,566
Howard	44,153	56.22%	34,007	43.30%	370	0.48%	10,146	12.92%	78,530
Kent	3,761	55.87%	2,925	43.45%	46	0.68%	836	12.42%	6,732
Montgomery	154,191	48.05%	165,187	51.48%	1,518	0.47%	-10,996	-3.43%	320,896
Prince George's	86,545	38.83%	133,816	60.04%	2,520	1.13%	-47,271	-21.21%	222,881
Queen Anne's	7,803	66.68%	3,857	32.96%	43	0.36%	3,946	33.72%	11,703
Somerset	4,222	58.93%	2,911	40.63%	32	0.44%	1,311	18.30%	7,165
St. Mary's	12,767	62.92%	7,434	36.64%	89	0.44%	5,333	26.28%	20,290
Talbot	8,170	66.97%	3,948	32.36%	81	0.67%	4,222	34.61%	12,199
Washington	25,912	63.76%	14,408	35.45%	318	0.79%	11,504	28.31%	40,638
Wicomico	16,272	63.18%	9,413	36.55%	70	0.27%	6,859	26.63%	25,755
Worcester	8,430	63.57%	4,787	36.10%	45	0.33%	3,643	27.47%	13,262
Totals	876,167	51.11%	826,304	48.20%	11,887	0.69%	49,863	2.91%	1,714,358

==== County that flipped from Republican to Democratic ====
- Montgomery

=== By congressional district ===
Bush won 4 of 8 congressional districts, including three held by Democrats. Dukakis won the other 4, including one that elected a Republican.

District	Dukakis	Bush	Representative
1st	36.4%	63.2%	Roy Dyson
2nd	37.4%	62.1%	Helen Delich Bentley
3rd	54.1%	45.2%	Ben Cardin
4th	41.9%	57.3%	Tom McMillen
5th	58.9%	40.0%	Steny Hoyer
6th	34.1%	65.4%	Beverly Byron
7th	81.3%	17.4%	Kweisi Mfume
8th	53.4%	46.1%	Connie Morella

== See also ==
- United States presidential elections in Maryland
- 1988 United States presidential election
- 1988 United States elections
