= 2004 Maryland Democratic presidential primary =

- March 2, 2004

99 Democratic National Convention delegates (69 pledged, 30 unpledged) The number of pledged delegates received is determined by the popular vote
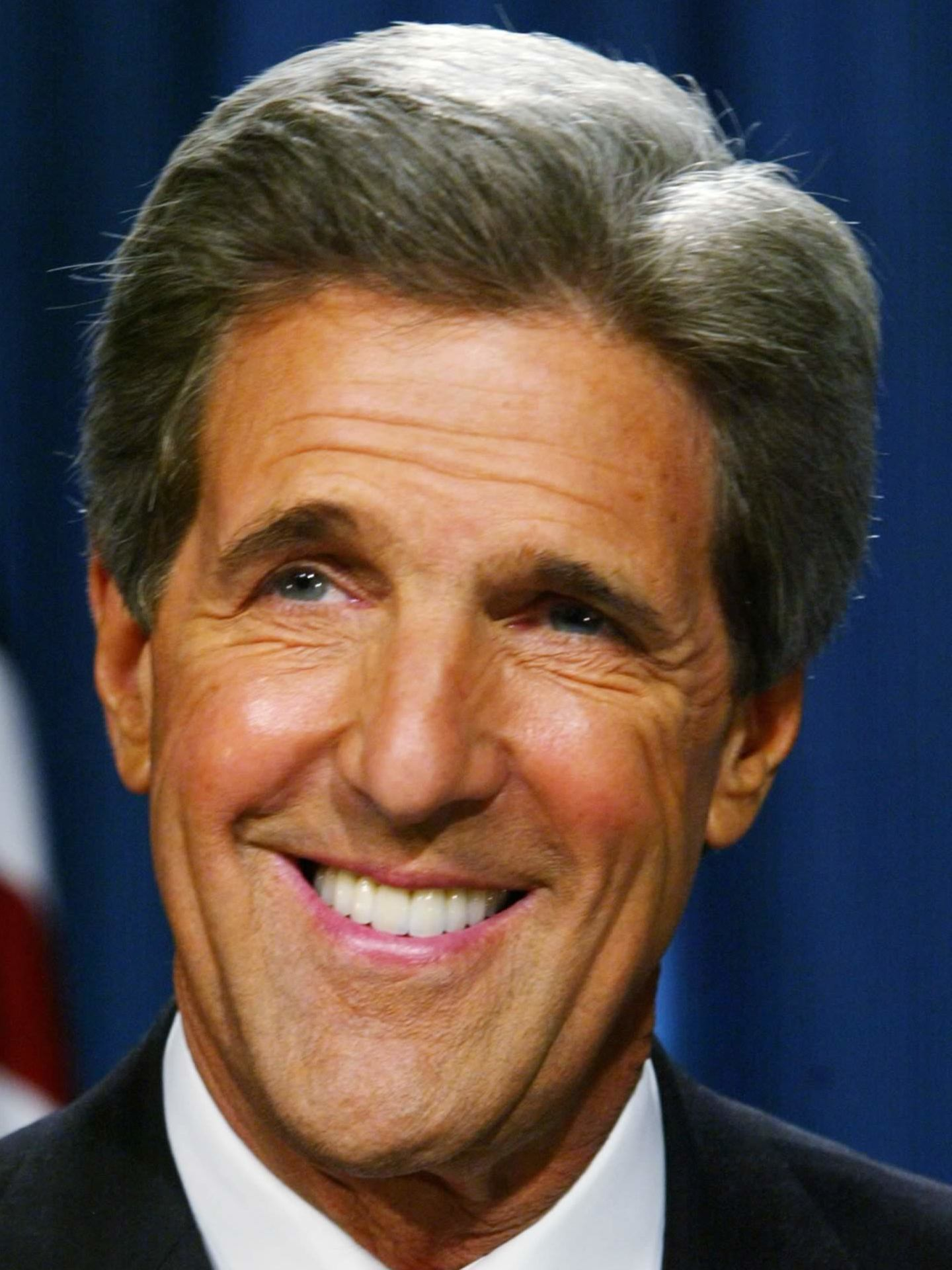

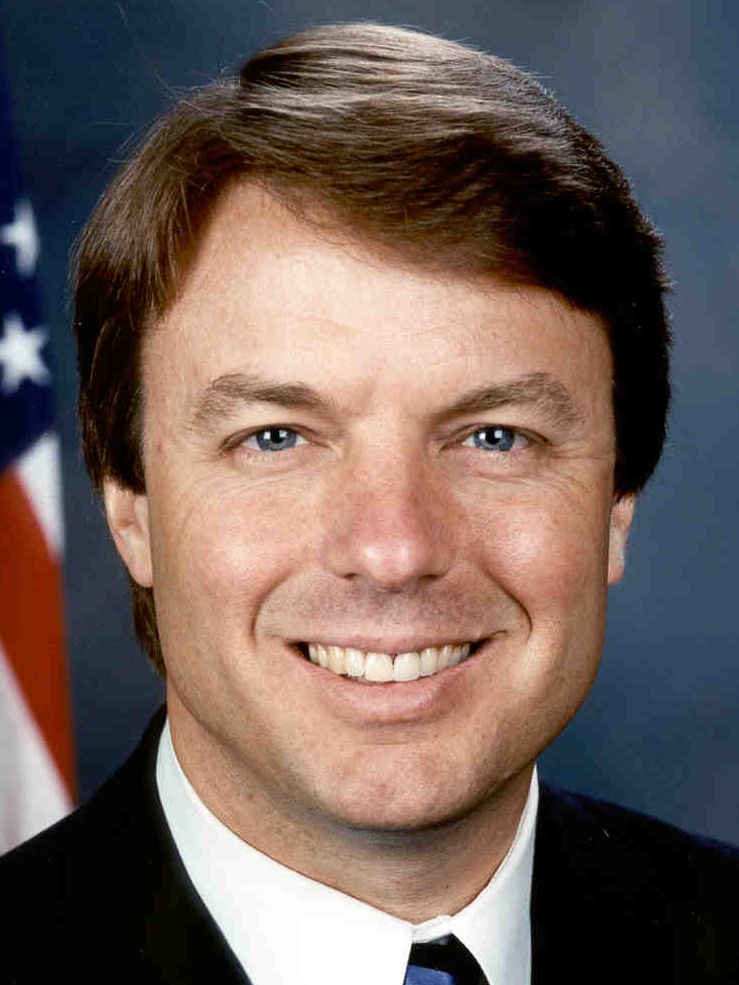
Candidate	John Kerry	John Edwards
Home state	Massachusetts	North Carolina
Delegate count	47	22
Popular vote	286,955	123,006
Percentage	59.60%	25.55%
- County results Kerry: 40–50% 50–60% 60–70%

The 2004 Maryland Democratic presidential primary took place on March 2, 2004 as part of the 2004 Democratic Party presidential primaries. The delegate allocation is proportional; candidates are awarded delegates in proportion to the percentage of votes received, open to registered Democrats only. Frontrunner John Kerry won the primary with former Senator John Edwards coming in a distant second.

== Results ==
Primary date: March 2, 2004

2004 Maryland Democratic presidential primary
Candidate	Votes	Percentage	Delegates
John Kerry	286,955	59.6%	47
John Edwards	123,006	25.6%	22
Al Sharpton	21,810	4.5%	0
Howard Dean	12,461	2.6%	0
Dennis Kucinich	8,693	1.8%	0
Uncommitted	8,527	1.8%	0
Joe Lieberman	5,245	1.1%	0
Others	14,779	3.1%	0
Total	472,783	100.00%	69

== See also ==
- 2004 Democratic Party presidential primaries
