= 2000 United States presidential election in Maryland =

- November 7, 2000
- Turnout: 74.87% ▲

Nominee	Al Gore	George W. Bush
Party	Democratic	Republican
Home state	Tennessee	Texas
Running mate	Joe Lieberman	Dick Cheney
Electoral vote	10	0
Popular vote	1,145,782	813,797
Percentage	56.57%	40.18%

Gore
40–50%
50–60%
60–70%
70–80%
80–90%
Bush
50–60%
60–70%
70–80%
President before election
Bill Clinton
Democratic
Elected President
George W. Bush
Republican

The 2000 United States presidential election in Maryland took place on November 7, 2000. Maryland participated in the 2000 United States presidential election along with the 49 other U.S. states and Washington, D.C. Voters chose 10 representatives, or electors, to the Electoral College, who voted for president and vice president.

Democratic Vice President Al Gore easily carried Maryland on election day, taking 56.57% of the vote to Republican Texas Governor George W. Bush's 40.18%. Maryland was one of two contests (along with the District of Columbia) and the only state where Gore improved on Bill Clinton's margin four years earlier. (Note: There were several other states where Gore scored a higher overall percentage of the vote than Clinton, due to a significant reduction in the third-party vote, as Ross Perot was no longer a candidate.) Gore's strong performance in the most highly-populated counties in the state, which are home to many urban and African American communities, contributed to his victory in the state.

Gore flipped Charles County; it was one of only two counties in the country to vote for Gore after having voted for Bob Dole in 1996, the other being Orange County, Florida. This was the first time since 1888 that Maryland gave a majority of the vote to a losing candidate. Bush became the first Republican ever to win the White House without carrying Charles County, as well as the first to do so without carrying Baltimore or Howard counties since Calvin Coolidge in 1924. Maryland was one of ten states that backed George H. W. Bush for president in 1988 that did not back George W. Bush in either 2000 or 2004.

== General election ==
=== Polling ===
Poll source	Date(s)	Sample size	Margin of error	George W. Bush (R)	Al Gore (D)	Ralph Nader (G)	Other / undecided (Note: Calculated by taking the difference of 100% and all other listed candidates combined. For polls that do not report a figure for Nader, this includes his support.)
Harris Insights & Analytics	November 3, 2000	5,230	—	39%	56%	4%	1%
Gonzales Research & Marketing Strategies Inc.	October 27, 2000	627	—	38%	52%	4%	6%
Mason-Dixon Polling & Strategy	October 26, 2000	625	—	40%	48%	5%	7%
Rasmussen Reports	October 26, 2000	696	—	40%	47%	—	13%
SurveyUSA	October 22, 2000	500	—	41%	52%	—	7%

=== Results ===
2000 United States presidential election in Maryland
Party	Candidate	Running mate	Votes	Percentage	Electoral votes
Democratic	Al Gore	Joe Lieberman	1,145,782	56.6%	10
Republican	George W. Bush	Dick Cheney	813,797	40.2%	0
Green	Ralph Nader	Winona LaDuke	53,768	2.7%	0
Libertarian	Harry Browne	Wayne Allyn Root	5,310	0.3%	0
Reform	Pat Buchanan	Ezola Foster	4,248	0.2%	0
Write Ins			1,480	0.1%	0
Constitution	Howard Phillips	Michael Peroutka	919	0.1%	0
Write In	John Hagelin	–	176	0.0%	0
Totals			2,025,480	100.00%	10
Voter turnout (voting age/registered)					51%/74%

==== Results by county ====
County	Al Gore Democratic		George W. Bush Republican		Ralph Nader Green		Various candidates Other parties		Margin		Total votes cast
County	#	%	#	%	#	%	#	%	#	%	Total votes cast
Allegany	10,894	41.31%	14,656	55.58%	610	2.31%	211	0.80%	-3,762	-14.27%	26,371
Anne Arundel	89,624	44.67%	104,209	51.93%	5,493	2.74%	1,331	0.66%	-14,585	-7.26%	200,657
Baltimore	160,635	52.83%	133,033	43.75%	8,544	2.81%	1,872	0.62%	27,602	9.08%	304,084
Baltimore City	158,765	82.52%	27,150	14.11%	5,512	2.86%	977	0.51%	131,615	68.41%	192,404
Calvert	12,986	43.57%	16,004	53.69%	660	2.21%	156	0.52%	-3,018	-10.12%	29,806
Caroline	3,396	37.94%	5,300	59.20%	198	2.21%	58	0.65%	-1,904	-21.26%	8,952
Carroll	20,146	31.46%	41,742	65.19%	1,681	2.63%	458	0.72%	-21,596	-33.73%	64,027
Cecil	12,327	42.69%	15,494	53.66%	794	2.75%	261	0.90%	-3,167	-10.97%	28,876
Charles	21,873	49.05%	21,768	48.82%	755	1.69%	196	0.44%	105	0.23%	44,592
Dorchester	5,232	45.93%	5,847	51.33%	222	1.95%	91	0.80%	-615	-5.40%	11,392
Frederick	30,725	39.06%	45,350	57.65%	2,052	2.61%	534	0.68%	-14,625	-18.59%	78,661
Garrett	2,872	26.95%	7,514	70.52%	203	1.91%	66	0.62%	-4,642	-43.57%	10,655
Harford	35,665	39.01%	52,862	57.82%	2,298	2.51%	599	0.66%	-17,197	-18.81%	91,424
Howard	58,556	51.92%	49,809	44.17%	3,643	3.23%	771	0.68%	8,747	7.75%	112,779
Kent	3,627	44.86%	4,155	51.39%	270	3.34%	33	0.41%	-528	-6.53%	8,085
Montgomery	232,453	62.54%	124,580	33.52%	12,485	3.36%	2,170	0.58%	107,873	29.02%	371,688
Prince George's	216,119	79.48%	49,987	18.38%	4,497	1.65%	1,306	0.48%	166,132	61.10%	271,909
Queen Anne's	6,257	37.33%	9,970	59.48%	446	2.66%	88	0.53%	-3,713	-22.15%	16,761
Somerset	3,785	49.78%	3,609	47.46%	142	1.87%	68	0.89%	176	2.32%	7,604
St. Mary's	11,912	40.38%	16,856	57.14%	568	1.93%	165	0.56%	-4,944	-16.76%	29,501
Talbot	5,854	38.43%	8,874	58.25%	424	2.78%	82	0.54%	-3,020	-19.82%	15,234
Washington	18,221	38.38%	27,948	58.88%	1,027	2.16%	274	0.58%	-9,727	-20.50%	47,470
Wicomico	14,469	45.51%	16,338	51.39%	762	2.40%	226	0.71%	-1,869	-5.88%	31,795
Worcester	9,389	45.24%	10,742	51.76%	482	2.32%	140	0.67%	-1,353	-6.52%	20,753
Totals	1,145,782	56.57%	813,797	40.18%	53,768	2.65%	12,133	0.60%	331,985	16.39%	2,025,480

Counties that flipped from Republican to Democratic

- Charles (largest town: Waldorf)

Counties that flipped from Democratic to Republican

- Dorchester (largest town: Cambridge)
- Kent (largest town: Chestertown)

==== Results by congressional district ====
Gore won five of the state's eight congressional districts, including one that elected a Republican.

District	Gore	Bush	Representative
1st	44%	53%	Wayne Gilchrest
2nd	41%	55%	Bob Ehrlich
3rd	63%	34%	Ben Cardin
4th	84%	13%	Albert Wynn
5th	55%	42%	Steny Hoyer
6th	38%	58%	Roscoe Bartlett
7th	84%	14%	Elijah Cummings
8th	60%	36%	Connie Morella

== Electors ==
Technically the voters of Maryland cast their ballots for electors: representatives to the Electoral College. Maryland is allocated 10 electors because it has eight congressional districts and two senators. All candidates who appear on the ballot or qualify to receive write-in votes must submit a list of 10 electors, who pledge to vote for their candidate and their running mate. Whoever wins a plurality of votes in the state is awarded all ten electoral votes. Their chosen electors then vote for president and vice president. Although electors are pledged to their candidate and running mate, they are not obligated to vote for them. An elector who votes for someone other than their candidate is known as a faithless elector.

The electors of each state and the District of Columbia met on December 18, 2000 to cast their votes for president and vice president. The Electoral College itself never meets as one body. Instead, the electors from each state and the District of Columbia met in their respective capitols.

The following were the members of the Electoral College from the state. All were pledged to and voted for Gore and Lieberman:

1. Clarence W. Blount
2. Gene W. Counihan
3. Howard Friedman
4. Mary Ann E. Love
5. Thomas V. Mike Miller
6. Mary Butler Murphy
7. Mary Jo Neville
8. Gregory Pecoraro
9. Ina Taylor
10. Beatrice P. Tignor

== See also ==
- United States presidential elections in Maryland
- 2000 United States presidential election
- 2000 United States elections
