= 1952 United States presidential election in Maryland =

- November 4, 1952

All 9 Maryland votes to the Electoral College

Nominee	Dwight D. Eisenhower	Adlai Stevenson
Party	Republican	Democratic
Home state	New York	Illinois
Running mate	Richard Nixon	John Sparkman
Electoral vote	9	0
Popular vote	499,424	395,337
Percentage	55.36%	43.83%
County results
Eisenhower
50–60%
60–70%
Stevenson
50–60%
President before election
Harry S. Truman
Democratic
Elected President
Dwight D. Eisenhower
Republican

The 1952 United States presidential election in Maryland took place on November 4, 1952, as part of the 1952 United States presidential election. State voters chose nine representatives, or electors, to the Electoral College, who voted for president and vice president.

Maryland was won by Columbia University President Dwight D. Eisenhower (R–New York), running with Senator Richard Nixon, with 55.36% of the popular vote, against Adlai Stevenson (D–Illinois), running with Senator John Sparkman, with 43.83% of the popular vote.

In this election, Maryland voted 0.69% to the right of the nation at-large.

== Results ==
1952 United States presidential election in Maryland
Party	Candidate	Votes	%
Republican	Dwight D. Eisenhower	499,424	55.36%
Democratic	Adlai Stevenson	395,337	43.83%
Progressive	Vincent Hallinan	7,313	0.81%
Total votes		902,074	100%

=== Results by county ===
County	Dwight D. Eisenhower Republican		Adlai Stevenson Democratic		Vincent Hallinan Progressive		Margin		Total votes cast
County	#	%	#	%	#	%	#	%	Total votes cast
Allegany	19,186	56.83%	14,529	43.03%	47	0.14%	4,657	13.80%	33,762
Anne Arundel	23,273	60.77%	14,739	38.48%	288	0.75%	8,534	22.29%	38,300
Baltimore	81,898	62.59%	48,476	37.04%	484	0.37%	33,422	25.55%	130,858
Baltimore City	166,605	47.62%	178,469	51.01%	4,784	1.37%	-11,864	-3.39%	349,858
Calvert	2,769	55.25%	2,209	44.07%	34	0.68%	560	11.18%	5,012
Caroline	4,155	60.23%	2,733	39.61%	11	0.16%	1,422	20.62%	6,899
Carroll	11,563	69.99%	4,934	29.86%	25	0.15%	6,629	40.13%	16,522
Cecil	6,482	53.58%	5,590	46.21%	26	0.21%	892	7.37%	12,098
Charles	4,334	56.13%	3,338	43.23%	49	0.63%	996	12.90%	7,721
Dorchester	5,524	52.61%	4,823	45.94%	152	1.45%	701	6.67%	10,499
Frederick	14,562	64.86%	7,851	34.97%	38	0.17%	6,711	29.89%	22,451
Garrett	4,980	68.42%	2,281	31.34%	18	0.25%	2,699	37.08%	7,279
Harford	10,770	60.99%	6,809	38.56%	80	0.45%	3,961	22.43%	17,659
Howard	5,497	59.09%	3,693	39.70%	112	1.20%	1,804	19.39%	9,302
Kent	3,656	59.24%	2,504	40.58%	11	0.18%	1,152	18.66%	6,171
Montgomery	47,805	62.37%	28,381	37.03%	467	0.61%	19,424	25.34%	76,653
Prince George's	38,060	56.30%	29,119	43.07%	423	0.63%	8,941	13.23%	67,602
Queen Anne's	3,170	50.60%	3,058	48.81%	37	0.59%	112	1.79%	6,265
Somerset	4,113	50.76%	3,951	48.76%	39	0.48%	162	2.00%	8,103
St. Mary's	4,270	54.11%	3,588	45.57%	33	0.42%	682	8.64%	7,891
Talbot	5,357	63.81%	3,019	35.96%	19	0.23%	2,338	27.85%	8,395
Washington	17,653	58.08%	12,657	41.64%	84	0.28%	4,996	16.44%	30,094
Wicomico	9,064	60.55%	5,878	39.28%	26	0.17%	3,185	21.27%	14,695
Worcester	4,681	63.13%	2,708	36.52%	26	0.35%	1,973	26.61%	7,415
Totals	499,424	55.36%	395,337	43.83%	7,313	0.81%	104,087	11.53%	902,074

==== Counties that flipped from Democratic to Republican ====
- Allegany
- Cecil
- Dorchester
- Kent
- Prince George's
- Queen Anne's
- St. Mary's
- Wicomico

=== Results by congressional district ===
Eisenhower won 6 out of 7 of Maryland's congressional districts. Candidate who won nationally is listed first.

District	Eisenhower	Stevenson
1st	57.4%	42.6%
2nd	63.4%	36.6%
3rd	38.2%	61.8%
4th	53.7%	46.3%
5th	57.1%	42.9%
6th	61.3%	38.7%
7th	51.3%	48.7%

== See also ==
- United States presidential elections in Maryland
- 1952 United States presidential election
- 1952 United States elections
