= Clara Barton Parkway =

Road in Maryland and Washington, D.C., U.S.

Route information
- Maintained by National Park Service
- Length: 6.8 mi (10.9 km)
- Existed: 1930–present
- Tourist routes: C&O Canal Scenic Byway
- Restrictions: No trucks; one-way traffic during rush hour

Major junctions
- West end: MacArthur Boulevard in Potomac, MD
- I-495 in Potomac, MD; Cabin John Parkway in Cabin John, MD
- East end: Chain Bridge / Canal Road NW in Washington, DC

Location
- Country: United States
- States: Maryland, District of Columbia
- Counties: Montgomery

Highway system
- Scenic Byways; National; National Forest; BLM; NPS
- Streets and Highways of Washington, DC; Interstate; US; DC; State-Named Streets

The Clara Barton Parkway is a parkway in the U.S. state of Maryland and Washington, D.C. The highway runs 6.8 miles (10.9 km) from MacArthur Boulevard in Carderock, Maryland, east to Canal Road at the Chain Bridge in Washington. The Clara Barton Parkway is a two- to four-lane parkway that parallels the Potomac River and the Chesapeake and Ohio Canal (C&O) in southwestern Montgomery County, Maryland, and the far western corner of Washington, D.C.

The parkway provides access to the communities of Cabin John and Glen Echo and several units of the Chesapeake and Ohio Canal National Historical Park. The Maryland portion of the George Washington Memorial Parkway was constructed from Carderock past Interstate 495 (I-495) to Glen Echo in the early to mid-1960s. The parkway was proposed to continue west to Great Falls and east to Georgetown. However, these proposals never came to fruition, and the parkway was extended only to the Chain Bridge in the early 1970s. The Maryland portion of the George Washington Memorial Parkway was renamed in 1989 in honor of Clara Barton, the founder of the American Red Cross, and whose original headquarters is located in Glen Echo.

== Route description ==
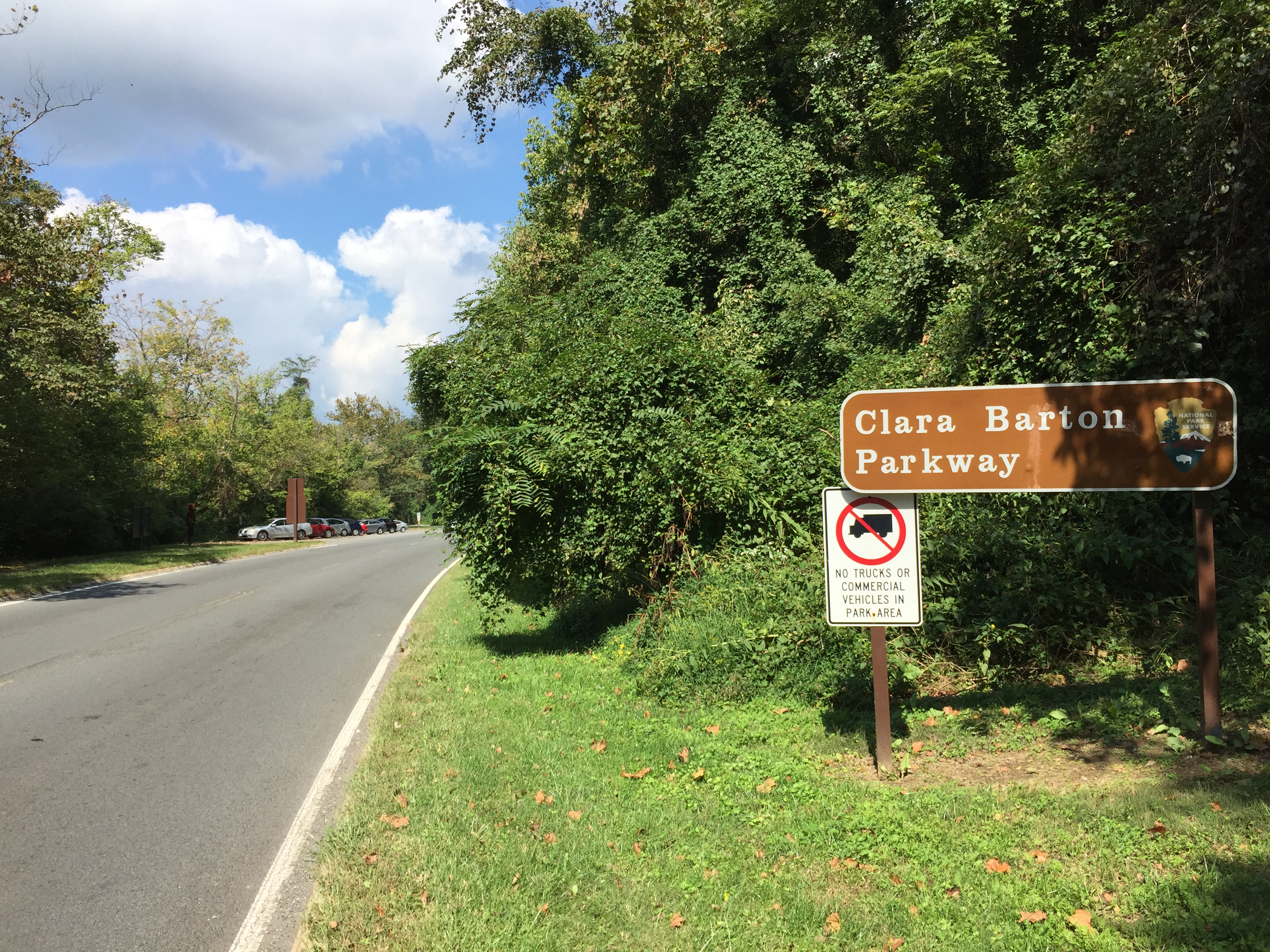
View northwest at the southeast end of the parkway

The Clara Barton Parkway begins at an intersection with MacArthur Boulevard in Carderock. MacArthur Boulevard heads west toward Great Falls and the community of Potomac. The Clara Barton Parkway heads east as a two-lane surface road that becomes a four-lane freeway ahead of its diamond interchange with an access road to the Carderock Division of the Naval Surface Warfare Center to the north, which features the David Taylor Model Basin, and Carderock Recreation Area of the Chesapeake and Ohio (C&O) Canal to the south. East of the naval lab, the two roadways split for the parkway's six-ramp interchange with I-495 (Capital Beltway). There is no direct access from the Clara Barton Parkway westbound to I-495 north or from I-495 south to the parkway eastbound. The parkway roadways come together in Cabin John just west of parking areas accessible from the eastbound direction to C&O Canal Lock 10 and C&O Canal Lock 8 and River Center. Access to Cabin John is provided by a diamond interchange to a road connecting the parkway with MacArthur Boulevard in that community.

The Clara Barton Parkway reduces to one lane eastbound as it crosses Cabin John Creek and meets the Cabin John Parkway at a partial interchange featuring ramps from the Clara Barton Parkway westbound to the Cabin John Parkway and from the Cabin John Parkway to the Clara Barton Parkway eastbound, which becomes two lanes again. At this point, the parkway passes in front of the historic Union Arch Bridge which spans the creek and carries the Washington Aqueduct and MacArthur Boulevard. The parkway continues east to its final interchange, which provides access to MacArthur Boulevard in Glen Echo, the location of Glen Echo Park and Clara Barton National Historic Site. The interchange features a U-turn ramp from the eastbound direction to the westbound lanes of the parkway, a tight right-turn ramp from the access road to westbound Clara Barton Parkway, and an unused bridge over the westbound direction. There is no access from MacArthur Boulevard to the eastbound parkway.

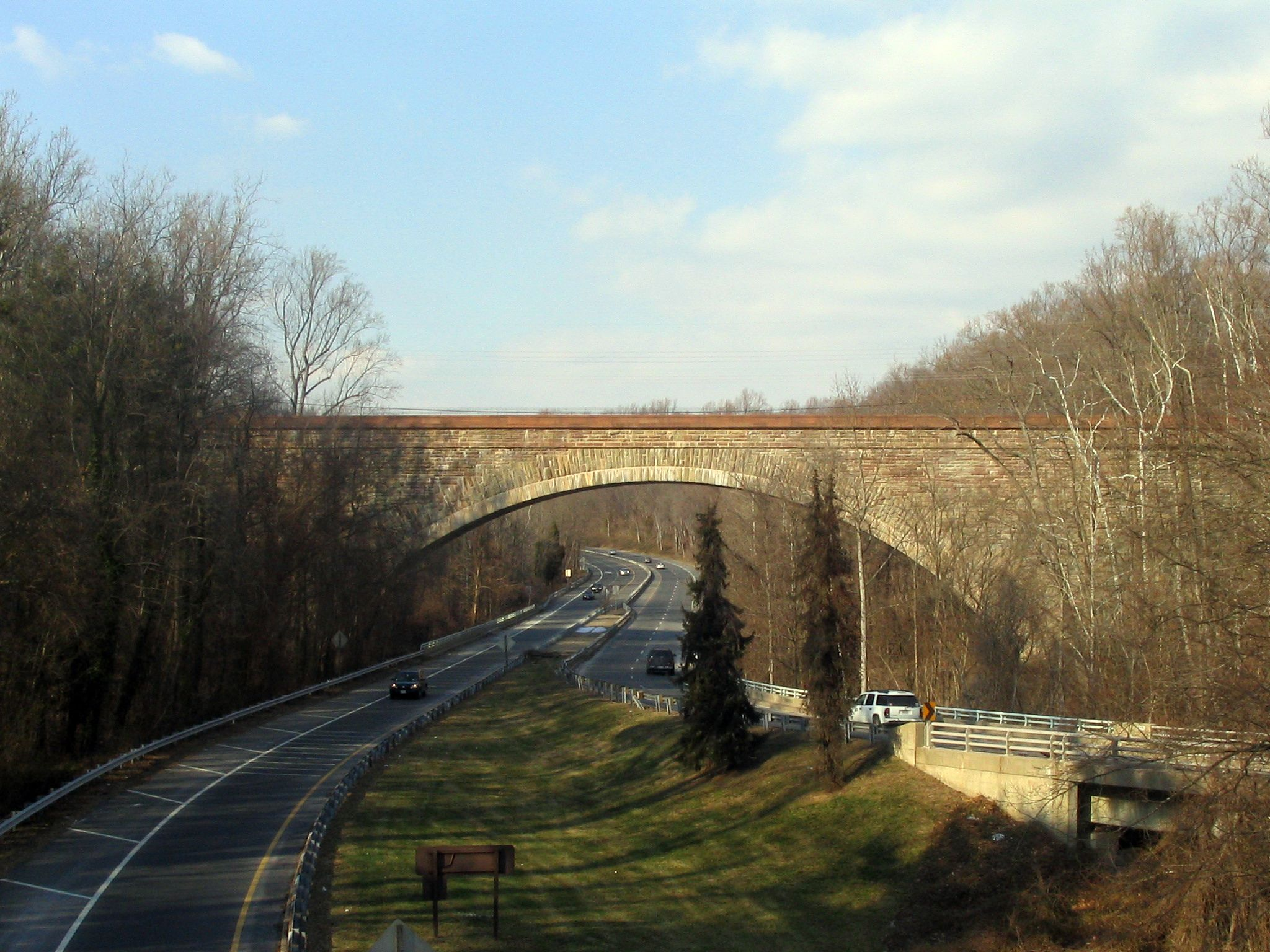
View of Union Arch Bridge from Clara Barton Parkway as it passes over Cabin John Creek.

East of Glen Echo, the Clara Barton Parkway reverts to a two-lane surface road that closely parallels MacArthur Boulevard on the hillside to the north. The parkway passes a pair of parking areas for Little Falls before passing a third parking area for C&O Canal Lock 6. This segment of the parkway includes two pedestrian overpasses providing access from MacArthur Boulevard and Ridge Drive respectively, and aligned with pedestrian crossing over the C&O Canal below, offering access to the canal’s towpath. The first pedestrian overpass is approximately half-way between Lock 6 and 7 (also aligning with Sycamore Island) and the second at Lock 5. The Clara Barton Parkway crosses Little Falls Branch and enters the District of Columbia before reaching its eastern terminus at an intersection with Canal Road and Chain Bridge Road. Canal Road heads east toward Georgetown while Chain Bridge Road crosses the Chain Bridge into Arlington, Virginia to connect with Virginia State Routes 120 and 123. Adjacent to the parkway’s terminus is access to the Capital Crescent Trail.

Commercial vehicles, including trucks, are prohibited from the Clara Barton Parkway without a permit from the National Park Service, which maintains the highway. Speed limits on the parkway are 30 miles per hour (48 km/h) from the western terminus to the Carderock interchange, 50 miles per hour (80 km/h) from the Carderock interchange to the Glen Echo interchange, and 35 miles per hour (56 km/h) from the Glen Echo interchange to the Chain Bridge. The Clara Barton Parkway operates as a one-way road between the Glen Echo interchange and its eastern terminus at the Chain Bridge Monday to Friday. Traffic flows eastbound only toward Washington from 6:15 a.m. to 10 a.m. and westbound only toward Glen Echo from 2:45 p.m. to 7:15 p.m. The Clara Barton Parkway is a part of the National Highway System as a principal arterial for its entire length.

== History ==
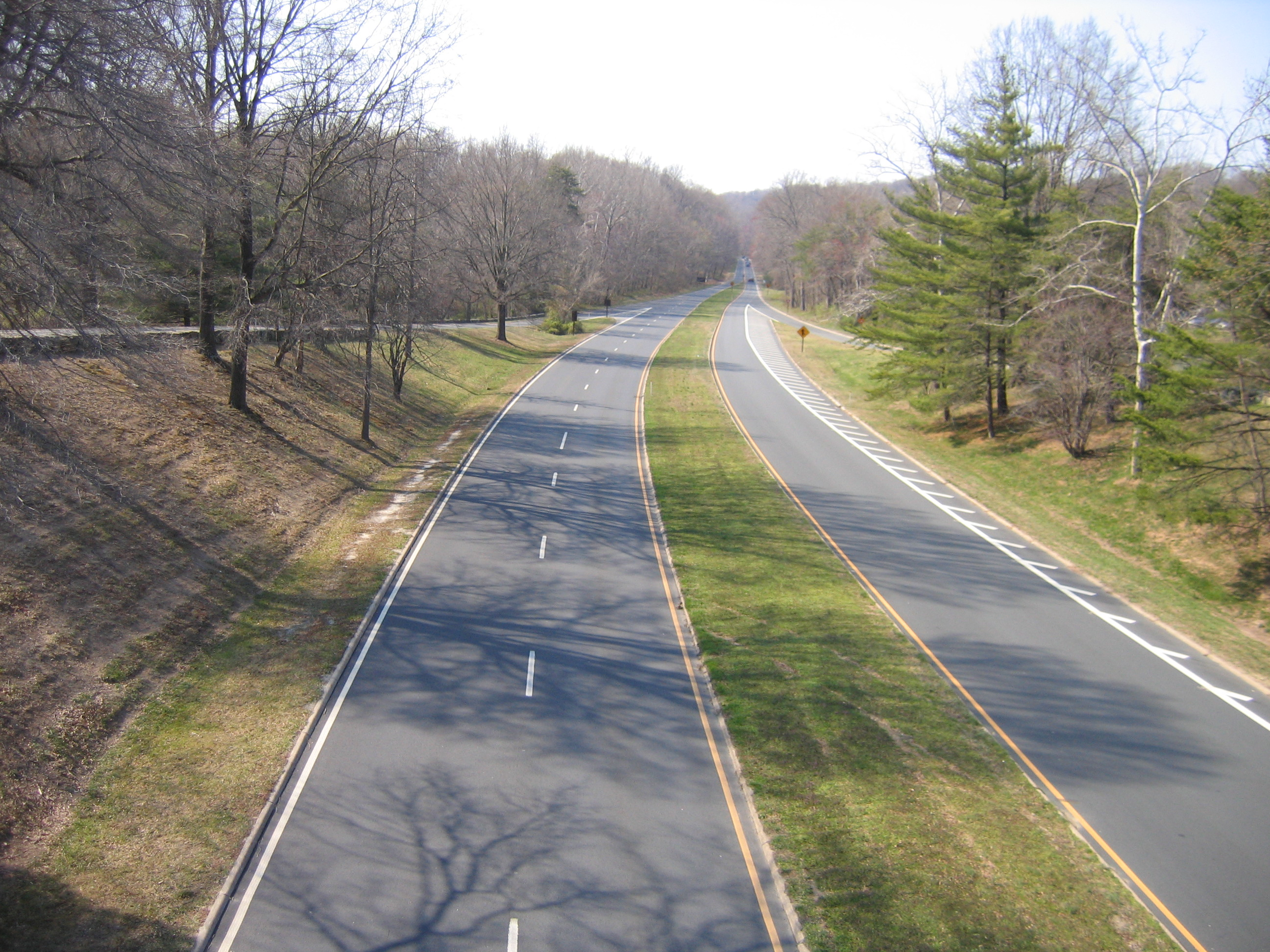
Clara Barton Parkway looking west from the Carderock interchange

Congress approved the construction of parkways on both sides of the Potomac River from Great Falls to Fort Washington and Mount Vernon in Maryland and Virginia, respectively, in 1930. Construction on what was originally named the George Washington Memorial Parkway on the Maryland side of the Potomac River was underway by 1961. The parkway was completed from its western end at MacArthur Boulevard to the interchange with Cabin John Parkway, which was not yet completed, in 1964. In 1965, the parkway opened from Cabin John east to the Glen Echo interchange. The Glen Echo interchange design was originally intended to be temporary, pending the construction of a signalized interchange just to the east, including an onramp overpass for west-bound traffic from McArthur Blvd. The concrete overpass bridge was completed but due to local objections, the new interchange was never completed. Extensions of the George Washington Memorial Parkway were proposed in both directions. From the west end, the parkway was to extend to the Chesapeake and Ohio Canal National Historical Park site at Great Falls. Going east, the parkway would continue to Georgetown, where it would tie into the western end of the Whitehurst Freeway at its junction with the Francis Scott Key Bridge. The unused bridge at the Glen Echo interchange was constructed and preliminary infrastructure work was done east of the interchange in anticipation of constructing a second carriageway east toward Georgetown. The plans to extend the parkway to Great Falls and Georgetown were abandoned by 1969. The parkway was completed in its present form from the Glen Echo interchange to the Chain Bridge in 1970. Maryland's version of the George Washington Memorial Parkway was renamed for Clara Barton in 1989.

== Major intersections ==
State	County	Location	mi	km	Destinations	Notes
Maryland	Montgomery	Potomac	0.0	0.0	MacArthur Boulevard – Great Falls, Cabin John	Western terminus
Maryland	Montgomery	Potomac	0.7	1.1	Western end of freeway section	
Maryland	Montgomery	Potomac	0.7	1.1	Carderock Division of the Naval Surface Warfare Center	Diamond interchange
Maryland	Montgomery	Potomac	1.6	2.6	I-495 – Maryland, Virginia, Dulles Airport	Exit 41 on I-495; no westbound access to I-495 north
Maryland	Montgomery	Cabin John	3.1	5.0	Cabin John	Access via MacArthur Boulevard
Maryland	Montgomery	Cabin John	3.5	5.6	Cabin John Parkway north to I-495 north – Maryland	Westbound exit and eastbound entrance; southern terminus of Cabin John Parkway
Maryland	Montgomery	Glen Echo	4.2	6.8	MacArthur Boulevard – Glen Echo	No eastbound entrance; western terminus of rush hour one-way segment
Maryland	Montgomery	Glen Echo	4.2	6.8	Eastern end of freeway section	
District of Columbia	City of Washington		6.8	10.9	Chain Bridge / Canal Road NW	Eastern terminus
1.000 mi = 1.609 km; 1.000 km = 0.621 mi: Incomplete access
