= Cabin John =

Cabin John may refer to some place names in the United States:

- Cabin John, Maryland
- Cabin John Aqueduct
- Cabin John Bridge
- Cabin John Creek (Potomac River)
- Cabin John Middle School
- Cabin John Parkway
