= List of suffixed Interstate Highways =

Dwight D. Eisenhower National System of Interstate and Defense Highways
- Highway shields for Interstate 35E and Interstate 69W
- Suffixed Interstate Highways in the 48 contiguous states as of 2026

System information
- Length: 372.5 mi (599.5 km)
- Formed: June 29, 1956

Highway names
- Interstates: Interstate X (I-X)

System links
- Interstate Highway System; Main; Auxiliary; Suffixed; Business; Future

In the United States, there are currently eight routes in the Interstate Highway System that are signed with letter suffixes to the route number. Interstate 35 (I-35) splits into I-35E and I-35W in the Dallas–Fort Worth metroplex in Texas, and similarly splits into I-35E and I-35W in the Minneapolis–St. Paul area in Minnesota. Other suffixed Interstates include I-69C, I-69E and I-69W in South Texas, and I-480N in Ohio, which is designated as such on mile markers but is otherwise unsigned. The state of Maryland has four unsigned suffixed Interstate designations that are designated by the Maryland State Highway Administration, rather than by the Federal Highway Administration (FHWA).

The 1958 Interstate Highway System plan included many suffixed Interstates.

There were once many more suffixed Interstates, as the three-digit Interstates were not designated until after all major routes were assigned numbers. Most of these were spurs; the suffixed route did not return to its parent. In 1980, the American Association of State Highway and Transportation Officials (AASHTO) abolished the majority of suffixes due to confusion, renumbering them as three-digit Interstates. For example, I-15E in California has since become I-215.

== List ==
Number	Length (mi)	Length (km)	Southern or western terminus	Northern or eastern terminus	Formed	Removed	Notes
I-5W	—	—	I-5 in Tracy, CA	I-5 in Dunnigan, CA	—	—	Replaced by I-580, I-80 and I-505
I-5E	—	—	I-5 in Tracy, CA	I-5 in Dunnigan, CA	1958	1982	Replaced by I-5
I-15E	—	—	I-15 in Temecula, CA	I-15 in Devore, CA	1973	1982	Renumbered from I-215 in 1973 and back to I-215 in 1982
I-15W	—	—	I-15 in Murrieta, CA	I-15 in San Bernardino, CA	1957	—	Became I-15 in 1957
I-15W	—	—	I-80N in Rupert, ID	I-15 in Pocatello, ID	1958	1980	Became I-86 in 1980; was also planned as I-82N
I-24W	—	—	I-55 in Hayti, MO	I-40 in Jackson, TN	—	1964	Did not connect to I-24; renumbered I-155
I-35W	85.20	137.12	I-35 in Hillsboro, TX	I-35 in Denton, TX	1959	current	
I-35E	96.76	155.72	I-35 in Hillsboro, TX	I-35 in Denton, TX	1959	current	
I-35W	—	—	I-35 in Wichita, KS	I-70 in Salina, KS	—	1976	Renumbered I-135
I-35W	41.78	67.24	I-35 in Burnsville, MN	I-35 in Forest Lake, MN	1960	current	
I-35E	39.34	63.31	I-35 in Burnsville, MN	I-35 in Forest Lake, MN	1970	current	Trucks over 9,000 lb (4,100 kg) gross weight prohibited between MN 5 and I-94
I-59B	—	—	Bypass for I-59 around Birmingham, AL		—	—	Renumbered I-459
I-69W	1.43	2.30	Fed. 85D at the Mexican border on the World Trade International Bridge in Laredo, TX	US 59/Loop 20 in Laredo, TX	2014	current	Partially completed
I-69C	18.02	29.00	I-2/US 83/US 281 in Pharr, TX	US 281/FM 490 in Edinburg, TX	2013	current	Partially completed
I-69E	81.00	130.36	East Rio Grande Valley segment: US 77/US 83/University Boulevard in Brownsville, TX Corpus Christi area segment: US 77 in Kingsville, TX	East Rio Grande Valley segment: US 77 near Raymondville, TX Corpus Christi area segment: I-37/US 77 in Corpus Christi, TX	2011	current	Partially completed
I-70S	—	—	I-70 in Washington, PA	I-70/I-80S in New Stanton, PA	1958	1964	Became part of I-70 and former I-70 became parts of I-79 and I-76
I-70N	—	—	I-70 in Frederick, MD	I-83/I-95 in Baltimore, MD	1958	1973	Became I-70
I-70S	—	—	I-70 in Frederick, MD	I-66/I-95 in Washington, D.C.	1958	1973	Became I-270
I-75E	—	—	Bypass for I-75 around Tampa-St. Petersburg, FL		—	1973	Renumbered I-275; later swapped with I-75 in 1973
I-80N	—	—	I-5 in Portland, OR	I-80 in Echo, UT	1958	1980	Became I-84
I-80S	—	—	I-70 in Arvada, CO	I-80 near Big Springs, NE	1958	1980	Became I-76
I-80N	—	—	I-80 in Neola, IA	I-29 in Loveland, IA	—	1973	Became part of I-680, then I-880 after I-680 was split
I-80N	—	—	I-80/I-90 in Lorain County, OH	I-80S/SR 5 in Braceville Township, OH	1960	1962	Redesignated as I-80
I-80S	—	—	I-80 in Youngstown, OH	I-295 in Bellmawr, NJ	—	1970	Extended west to Lodi, OH, by 1962 over former I-80; east end truncated to Monroeville, PA, and the part east of Monroeville renumbered I-76 in 1964; the rest became part of I-76
I-81S	—	—	I-81 in Scranton, PA	I-80 at Crescent Lake	—	1964	Formerly I-82, became I-81E (now I-380)
I-81E	—	—	I-81 in Scranton, PA	I-80 in Scotrun, PA	1964	1973	Formerly I-81S, became I-380
I-82S	—	—	Burley, ID	Tremonton, UT	1957	—	Became I-84
I-82N	—	—	Burley, ID	Pocatello, ID	1957	—	Became I-86
I-90N	—	—	Buffalo, NY	Canadian border in Lewiston, NY	1957	1959	Original designation for I-190 in New York, renamed I-190
I-94N	—	—	Muskegon, MI	I-94 in Grand Rapids, MI	1957	1959	Became I-196 in 1959 and then I-96 in 1964
I-95E	—	—	East Providence, RI	-	1957	1959	Renumbered I-195
I-180N	—	—	I-80N	Boise, ID	—	1980	This was the only suffixed three-digit Interstate (until I-480N in Ohio was designated); all other spurs of suffixed routes had no suffix; became I-184
I-270Y	2.10	3.38	I-270 in Bethesda, MD	I-495 in Bethesda, MD	1975	current	Signed as I-270 Spur; designated internally by the Maryland State Highway Administration as I-270Y.
I-480N	1.99	3.20	I-480 in Maple Heights, OH	US 422 in Warrensville Heights, OH	1974	current	Signed as I-480 on guide signs and reassurance markers, signed as I-480N on mile markers
I-495X	1.50	2.41	I-495 in Bethesda, MD	Clara Barton Parkway in Cabin John, MD	1965	current	Also known as Cabin John Parkway; designated internally by the Maryland State Highway Administration as I-495X; unsigned; trucks are not allowed on the length of the freeway
I-895A	0.71	1.14	Interstate 895#I-895BI-895B in Brooklyn Park, MD	I-97 in Ferndale, MD	1965	current	Unsigned. Internally designated by the Maryland State Highway Administration as I-895A
I-895B	2.67	4.30	I-895 in Brooklyn Park, MD	Governor Ritchie Highway in Glen Burnie, MD	1965	current	Unsigned. Internally designated by the Maryland State Highway Administration as I-895B
Former

== See also ==
- List of divided U.S. Routes
