= Maryland Route 188 =

State highway in Montgomery County, Maryland, United States, known as Wilson Lane

Maryland Route 188
- Wilson Lane
- Maryland Route 188 highlighted in red

Route information
- Maintained by MDSHA
- Length: 3.25 mi (5.23 km)
- Existed: 1927–present

Major junctions
- West end: MacArthur Boulevard near Glen Echo
- MD 190 in Bethesda; MD 191 in Bethesda
- East end: MD 187 in Bethesda

Location
- Country: United States
- State: Maryland
- Counties: Montgomery

Highway system
- Maryland highway system; Interstate; US; State; Scenic Byways
← MD 187	→ MD 189

Maryland Route 188 (MD 188) is a state highway in the U.S. state of Maryland. Known as Wilson Lane, the highway runs 3.25 miles (5.23 km) from MacArthur Boulevard near Glen Echo east to MD 187 in Bethesda in Montgomery County. MD 188 runs mainly through residential areas in its course through the affluent suburb of Bethesda. The highway was originally paved in the early 1910s and widened in the mid-1920s.

== Route description ==
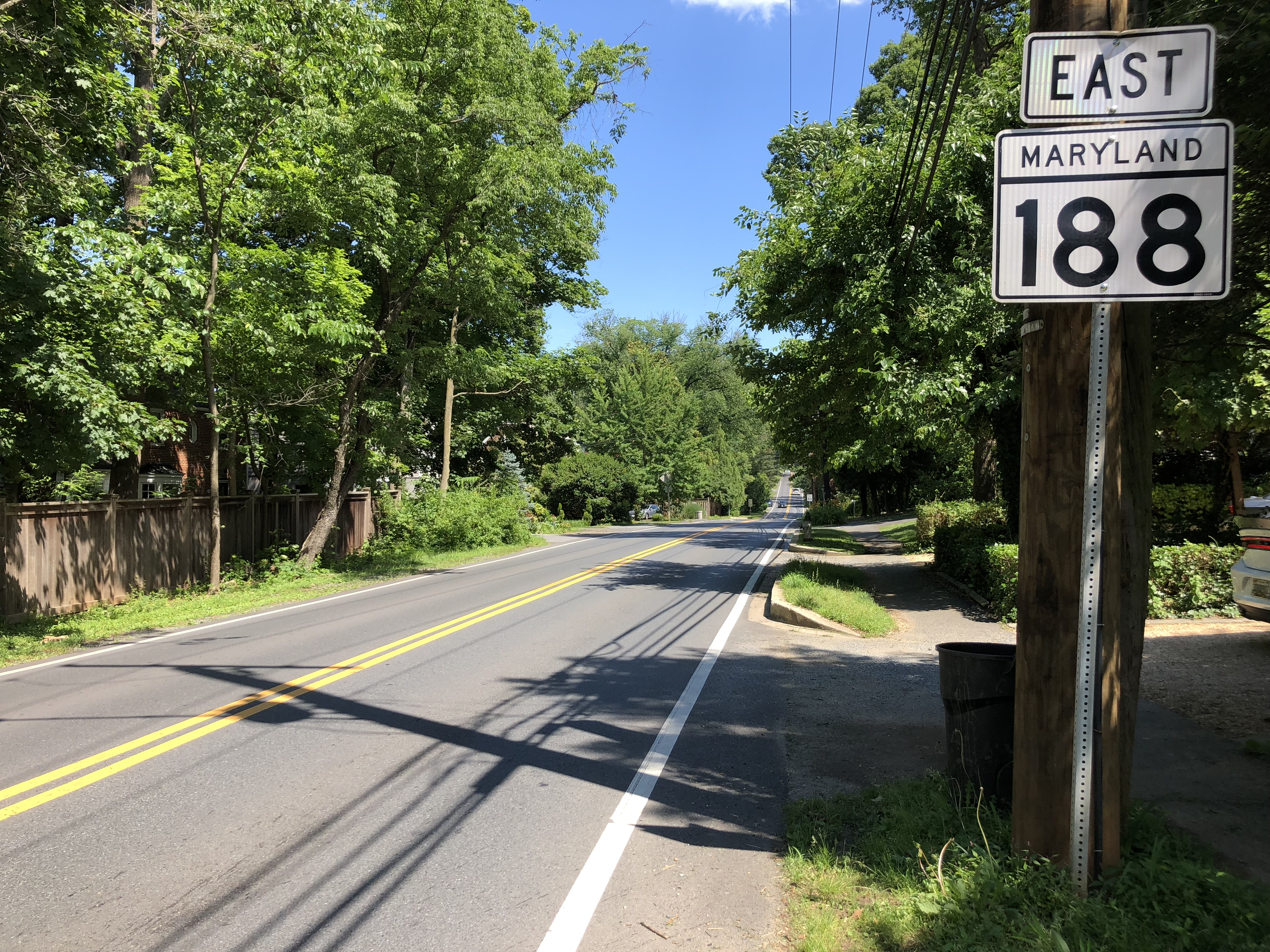
View east along MD 188 at Aberdeen Road in Bethesda

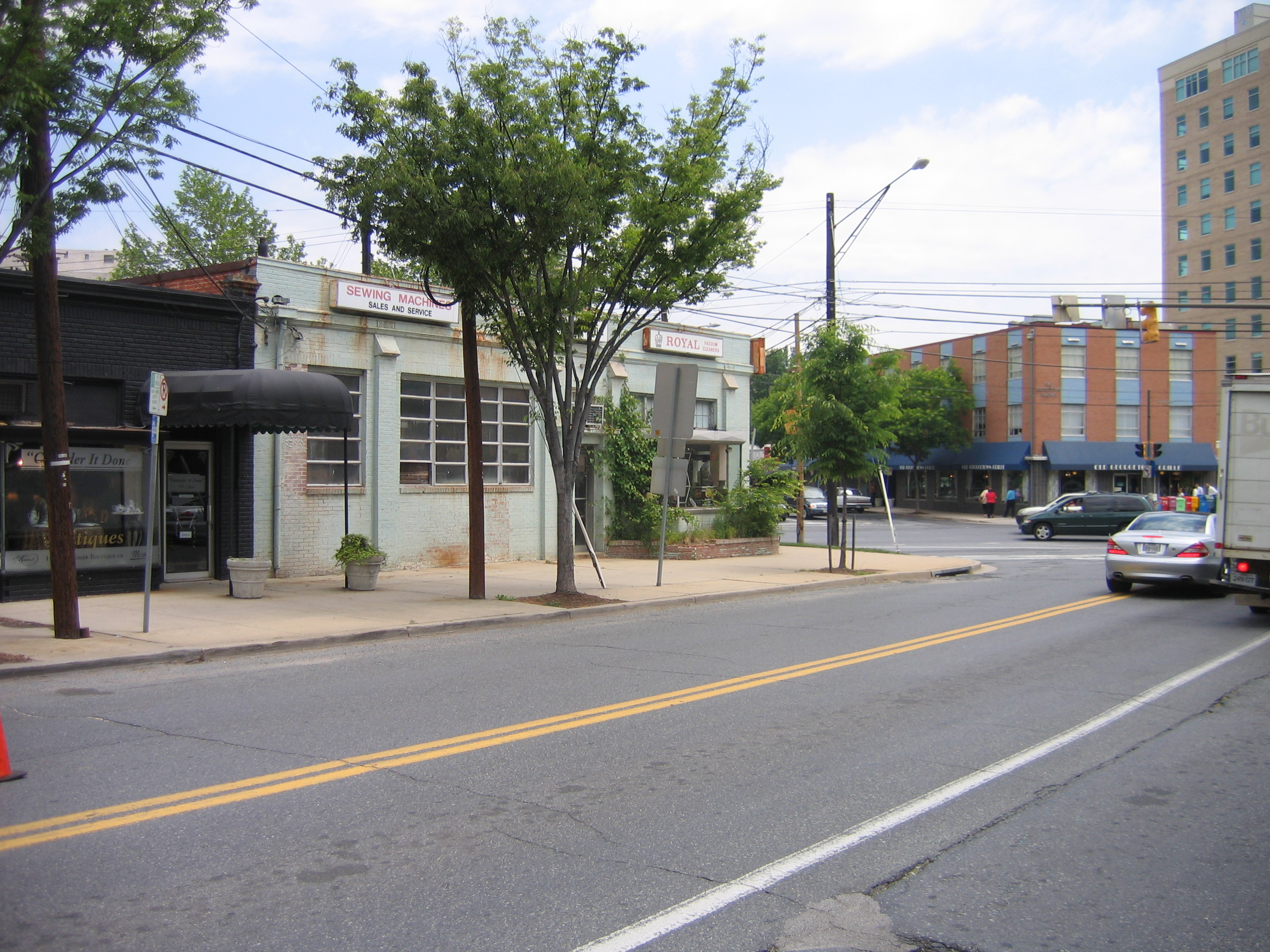
MD 188 eastbound approaching its terminus at MD 187 in Bethesda

MD 188 begins at MacArthur Boulevard just north of the town of Glen Echo and just east of the Union Arch Bridge, which the county-maintained highway uses to cross the deep valley of Cabin John Creek. The highway heads northeast as a two-lane undivided road between affluent residential neighborhoods in the western part of Bethesda. MD 188 temporarily expands to a four-lane divided highway around its intersection with MD 190 (River Road). The highway is flanked on its eastbound side by a service road as it passes south of the Landon School. MD 188 veers southeast at its intersection with Aberdeen Road and Merrick Road, then has a sharp turn east at Maiden Lane just west of its intersection with MD 191 (Bradley Boulevard). The highway heads straight east toward the edge of downtown Bethesda, where the route has its eastern terminus at a five-way intersection with MD 187 (Old Georgetown Road), Arlington Road, and St. Elmo Avenue. There is no direct access from MD 188 to northbound MD 187; that movement requires using Cordell Avenue one block west of the terminus.

== History ==
Wilson Lane was proposed to be paved by Montgomery County with funding from the state by 1910. The highway was built as a 14-foot-wide (4.3 m) macadam road from the Woodmont area of Bethesda west to Glen Echo by 1915. The 1 mile (1.6 km) of MD 188 west from MD 187 was widened with a pair of 3-foot-wide (0.91 m) concrete shoulders in 1926. The state highway was resurfaced with concrete by 1946. MD 188 has changed little since then.

== Major intersections ==
The entire route is in Montgomery County.

Location	mi	km	Destinations	Notes
Glen Echo–Bethesda line	0.00	0.00	MacArthur Boulevard	Western terminus
Bethesda	0.90	1.45	MD 190 (River Road)	
Bethesda	2.34	3.77	MD 191 (Bradley Boulevard)	
Bethesda	3.25	5.23	MD 187 south (Old Georgetown Road) / Arlington Road / St. Elmo Avenue	Eastern terminus; no direct access to MD 187 north
1.000 mi = 1.609 km; 1.000 km = 0.621 mi: Incomplete access
