= Maryland Route 614 =

State highway in Maryland, United States

Maryland Route 614
- Goldsboro Road

Route information
- Maintained by MDSHA
- Length: 1.97 mi (3.17 km)
- Existed: 1935–present

Major junctions
- South end: MacArthur Boulevard in Glen Echo
- MD 396 in Bethesda; MD 190 in Bethesda
- North end: MD 191 in Bethesda

Location
- Country: United States
- State: Maryland
- Counties: Montgomery

Highway system
- Maryland highway system; Interstate; US; State; Scenic Byways
← MD 611	→ MD 615

Maryland Route 614 (MD 614) is a state highway in the U.S. state of Maryland. Known as Goldsboro Road, the state highway runs 1.97 miles (3.17 km) from MacArthur Boulevard near Glen Echo north to MD 191 in Bethesda in southwestern Montgomery County. MD 614 was constructed in the mid-1930s from MD 396 to MD 190. The highway was extended to its present termini in the late 1970s.

== Route description ==
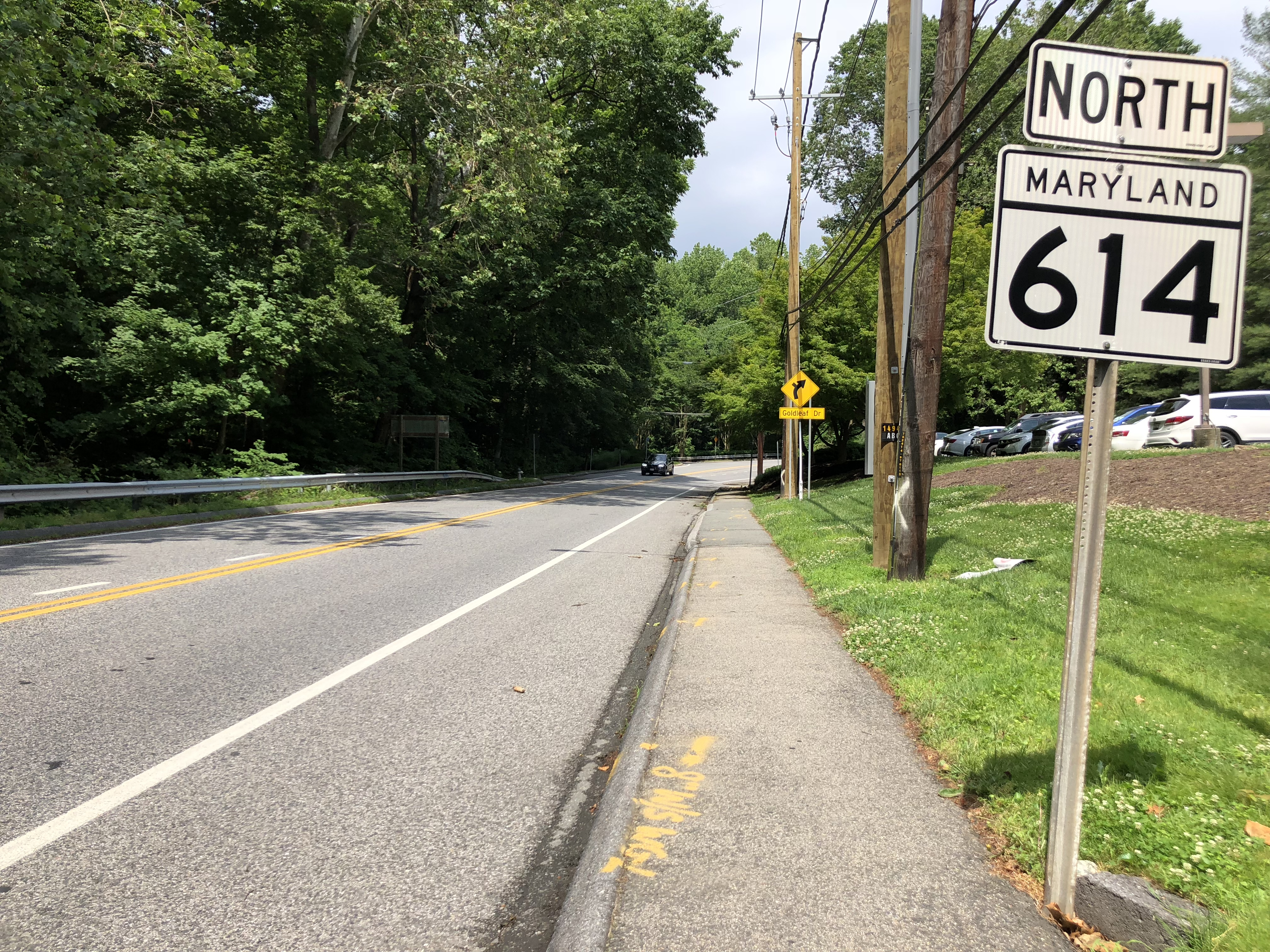
View north at along MD 614 past MD 396 in Bethesda

MD 614 begins at a directional intersection with MacArthur Boulevard on the town line between of Glen Echo and Bethesda, adjacent to the entrance to the Clara Barton National Historic Site and Glen Echo Park. The state highway heads northeast as a two-lane undivided highway that parallels Minnehaha Branch. MD 614 passes the western terminus of MD 396 (Massachusetts Avenue) before temporarily widening to a four-lane divided highway on either side of its intersection with MD 190 (River Road). MD 614 continues east, passing through Kenwood Country Club before reaching its northern terminus at MD 191 (Bradley Boulevard) in Bethesda.

== History ==
MD 614 west of MD 396 was built as part of that highway; the concrete road was constructed in 1934 and 1935. MD 614 from MD 396 to MD 190 was built as a concrete road in 1935. In 1978, the state highway was extended west over MD 396 to MacArthur Boulevard and east from MD 190 to MD 191. The MD 396–MD 614 intersection was originally a wye; the junction was changed to its current T intersection by 1999.

== Major intersections ==
The entire route is in Montgomery County.

Location	mi	km	Destinations	Notes
Glen Echo–Bethesda line	0.00	0.00	MacArthur Boulevard – Glen Echo Park	Traffic circle; southern terminus
Bethesda	0.46	0.74	MD 396 east (Massachusetts Avenue)	Western terminus of MD 396
Bethesda	1.04	1.67	MD 190 (River Road) to I-495	
Bethesda	1.97	3.17	MD 191 (Bradley Boulevard)	Northern terminus
1.000 mi = 1.609 km; 1.000 km = 0.621 mi

== Auxiliary routes ==
MD 614 has four auxiliary routes. All four are 0.02-mile (0.032 km) right-turn ramps at the state highway's intersection with MD 190.

- MD 614A is the ramp from eastbound MD 190 to southbound MD 614.
- MD 614B is the ramp from southbound MD 614 to westbound MD 190.
- MD 614C is the ramp from westbound MD 190 to northbound MD 614.
- MD 614D is the ramp from northbound MD 614 to eastbound MD 190.

The four auxiliary routes were assigned to the four ramps by 1999.
