= Falls Road =

Falls Road may refer to:

== Roads ==
- Falls Road, Belfast
- Two unrelated roads in Maryland:
  - Maryland Route 25, in Baltimore city and county
    - Falls Road station, on the Baltimore Light Rail
  - Maryland Route 189, in Montgomery County

== Rail ==
- Falls Road Railroad, a short-line railway between Niagara Falls and Brockport, New York, United States
- The Rochester, Lockport and Niagara Falls Railroad, also known as the "Falls Road", once operated on the same route as its namesake
