= Tom Patrick Green =

American painter (1942–2012)

Tom Green
- Born: Thomas Patrick Green, Jr. May 27, 1942; Newark, New Jersey, U.S.
- Died: September 3, 2012 (aged 70); Cabin John, Maryland, U.S.
- Education: University of Maryland
- Occupations: Painter, professor

Thomas Patrick Green, Jr. (May 27, 1942 – September 3, 2012), known more commonly as Tom Green, was an American painter and professor. He taught at Corcoran College of Art and Design, for many years. Green is associated with the Washington Color School art movement.

== Biography ==
Thomas Patrick Green, Jr. was born on May 27, 1942, in Newark, New Jersey. Green was the oldest of four children, his father worked at the United States Government Printing Office in Washington, D.C. He attended the University of Maryland, where he received his B.A. degree in 1969, and M.A. degree in 1971.

Themes within Green's work include, "language, translation, biomorphic imagery, anthropology, color, and mysticism". Some of his paintings have often been compared to Keith Haring, in terms of style and colors and described as "hieroglyphic". Green often worked on large canvases.

In 1975, Green was included in the Whitney Biennial at the Whitney Museum of American Art. Green's other group exhibitions include his solo exhibitionINVENTORY (2007) at George Mason University's Fine Arts Gallery, 6 Painters (2011) at Civilian Art Projects. He had a solo exhibition at Curator’s Office (March 2012), months before his died.

Green taught art classes at the Corcoran College of Art and Design for approximately 40 years, and retired in 2009.

== Death and legacy ==
Green died on September 3, 2012, in Cabin John, Maryland, after struggling with amyotrophic lateral sclerosis. His work is included in the public museum collections at Smithsonian American Art Museum, and Baltimore Museum of Art.

Green's work was featured in the postmortem retrospective exhibition, Tom Green: Accident and Intent (2010) at the American University Museum at the Katzen Arts Center.
