= Washington Aqueduct =

- U.S. National Register of Historic Places
- U.S. National Historic Landmark
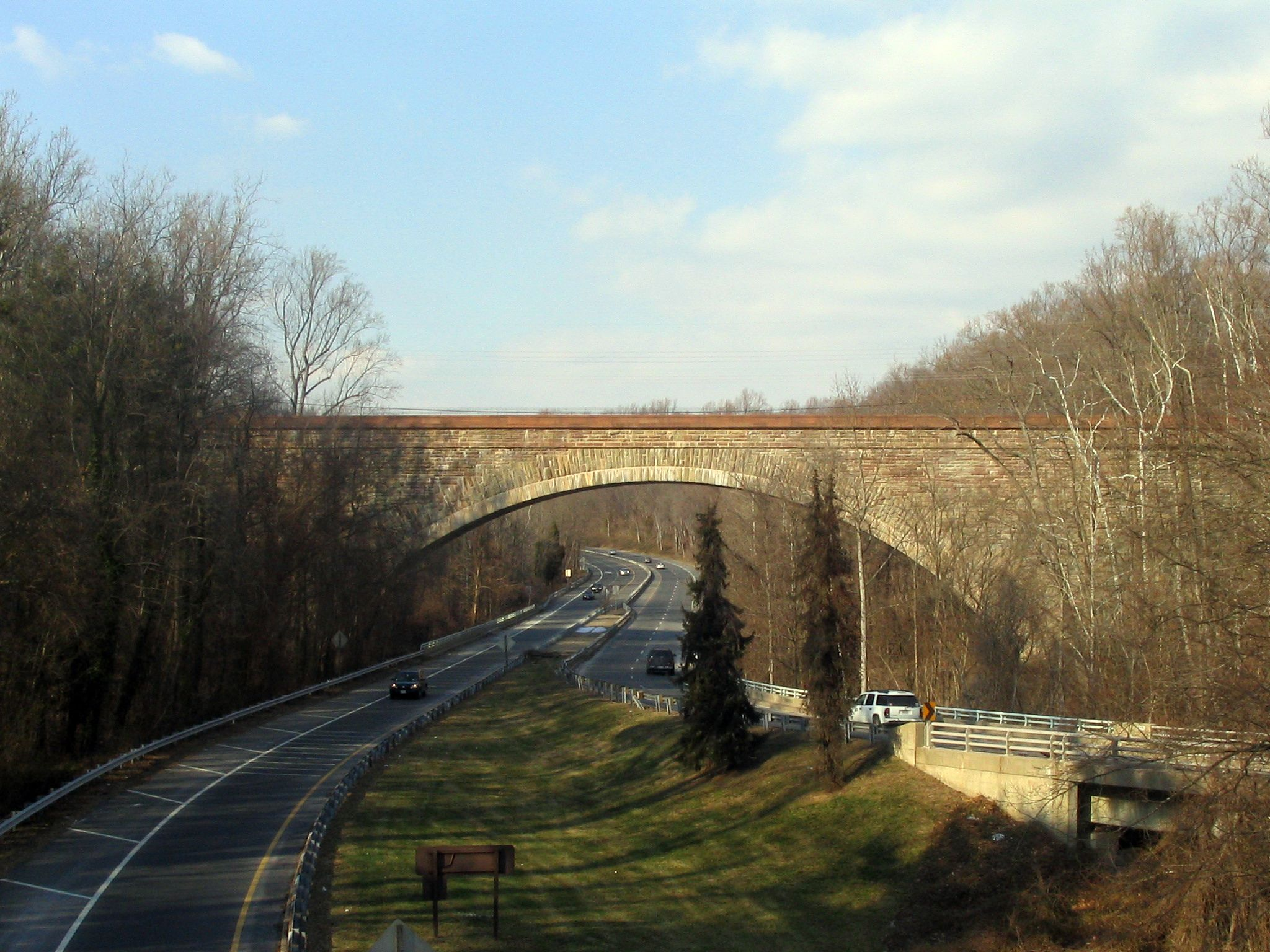
- The Union Arch Bridge carries the Washington Aqueduct across Cabin John Creek in 2008

- Location within District of Columbia
- Location: 5900 MacArthur Blvd., NW; Washington, D.C.
- Coordinates: 38°56′15″N 77°6′51″W
- Built: 1853-1864
- Architect: Montgomery C. Meigs
- NRHP reference No.: 73002123

Significant dates
- Added to NRHP: September 8, 1973
- Designated NHL: November 7, 1973

The Washington Aqueduct is an aqueduct that brings water from the Potomac River to Washington, D.C., and parts of its suburbs.

One of the first major aqueduct projects in the United States, it was commissioned by the U.S. Congress in 1852, and construction began the following year under the supervision of Montgomery C. Meigs and the U.S. Army Corps of Engineers. Portions of the aqueduct began operation on January 3, 1859, and the full pipeline began operating in 1864. It has been in continuous use ever since.

Owned and operated by the Corps of Engineers, the aqueduct is part of the system that supplies the public water systems that serve D.C. and nearby Virginia locations, including Arlington County, Falls Church, and part of Fairfax County.

It is listed as a National Historic Landmark. The Union Arch Bridge, which carries a portion of the aqueduct, is also listed as a Historic Civil Engineering Landmark.

== Design and facilities ==
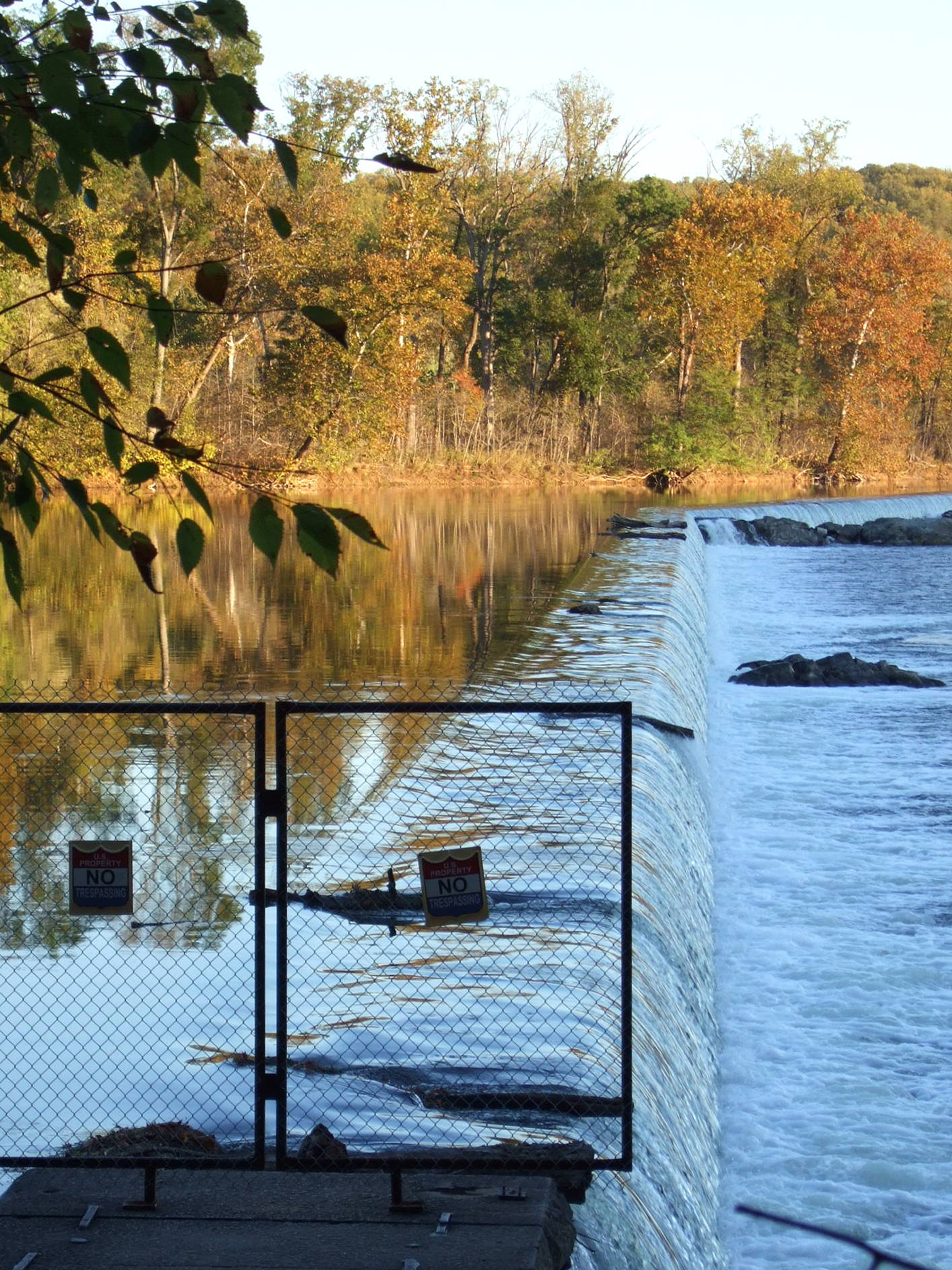
The Washington Aqueduct Dam, upstream of the Potomac River's Great Falls

The centerpiece of the Aqueduct is a 12-mile (19 km) pipeline that connects the system's dam at Great Falls with the Dalecarlia Reservoir on the border with Montgomery County, Maryland. Portions of the Aqueduct went online on January 3, 1859, and the full pipeline began operating in 1864. The pipeline runs along what is now MacArthur Boulevard, traversing some of the higher cliffs along the Potomac River.

The Union Arch Bridge carries the pipeline and MacArthur Boulevard over Cabin John Creek and the Cabin John Parkway near the community of Cabin John, Maryland. This bridge was the longest masonry arch bridge in the world for 40 years.

The Dalecarlia Reservoir serves as a primary sedimentation basin. A portion of the water from the reservoir is treated at the nearby Dalecarlia Water Treatment Plant and distributed to municipal water mains. The remainder of the water from the reservoir flows to the Georgetown Reservoir in the Palisades neighborhood of Washington. This facility serves as an additional sedimentation basin, and then the water flows through the Washington City Tunnel to the treatment facility at the McMillan Reservoir, after which it is pumped through city mains. The Dalecarlia Reservoir was modified in 1895 and 1935 to improve water quality and increase water supply.

== Expansion ==
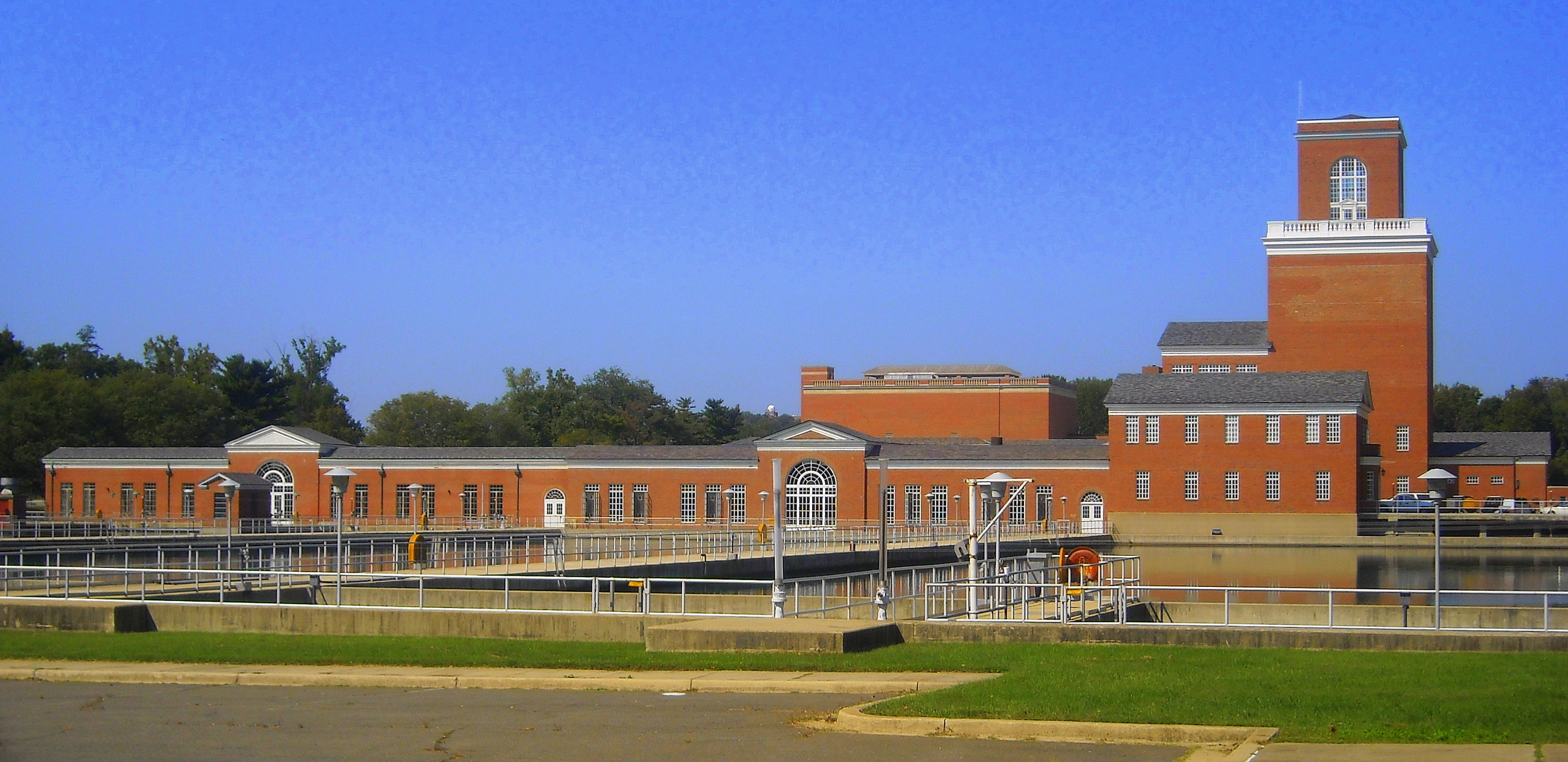
Dalecarlia Water Treatment Plant

The Aqueduct originally used a single pipe to deliver water. It lacked water purification plants, relying instead on the reservoirs to act as settling basins. By the turn of the 20th century, Washington's growth and the high amount of sediment in the Potomac's water kept the reservoirs from doing their jobs well. In 1905, the first treatment plant, a massive slow sand filter bed system, was completed at McMillan Reservoir . Improvements in the early 1900s were planned and supervised by Army engineer Henry C. Newcomer. The regular use of chlorine as a disinfectant began in 1923 at the McMillan plant. The McMillan plant was not replaced until 1985, when a rapid sand filter plant was opened next to it.

In the 1920s, a second pipe was added from Great Falls to Dalecarlia, along with several new reservoirs and a pumping station. A rapid sand filter plant at Dalecarlia Reservoir went online in 1927. A 1950s upgrade made the Dalecarlia plant larger than the McMillan plant; it is the one that serves the Virginia communities that draw water from the Aqueduct.

In 1926, Congress approved selling water from the aqueduct to Arlington County, Virginia. A new water supply pipe at Chain Bridge enabled service to Arlington to begin in 1927. More pipes were built as Arlington grew, including one under the Potomac River. In 1947, Congress approved adding the city of Falls Church, Virginia, to the aqueduct system, and nearby portions of Fairfax County, Virginia, were added in the 1960s.

In 1959, the U.S. Army Corps of Engineers built Little Falls Dam, a new intake, and a pumping station. This intake provides about 15 to 20 percent of the river water used by the aqueduct, and up to 30 percent during drought conditions.

== Operations and service area ==
The Aqueduct is a wholesale water supplier to utilities that bill customers and manage water mains. The service area is:

- Washington, D.C., and most of the federal installations in the city through the District of Columbia Water and Sewer Authority
- Arlington County, Virginia
- Falls Church, Virginia, and part of Fairfax County, including McLean
