= Cabin John, Maryland =

- Census-designated place
- Location in Montgomery County and Maryland
- Coordinates: 38°58′26″N 77°09′47″W
- Country: United States
- State: Maryland
- County: Montgomery

Area
  - Total: 1.64 sq mi (4.25 km^{2})
  - Land: 1.22 sq mi (3.16 km^{2})
  - Water: 0.42 sq mi (1.09 km^{2})
- Elevation: 141 ft (43 m)

Population (2020)
  - Total: 2,459
  - Density: 2,015.7/sq mi (778.25/km^{2})
- Time zone: UTC−5 (Eastern (EST))
  - Summer (DST): UTC−4 (EDT)
- ZIP code: 20818
- Area codes: 301, 240
- FIPS code: 24-12075
- GNIS feature ID: 2389262

Cabin John is a census-designated place and unincorporated area in Montgomery County, Maryland, United States. As of the 2020 census, it had a population of 2,459. Overlooking the Potomac River, it is a suburb of Washington, D.C.

== History ==
Early land records in 1715 cite Captain John's Run, now called Cabin John Creek. The toponym "Cabin John" is thought to be a corruption of the name "Captain John", but the origin of the name remains unresolved.

Cabin John is the location of the Union Arch Bridge, built between 1857 and 1864 over Cabin John Creek; at the time of its completion, the bridge was the longest single-span masonry arch in the world and remains the longest in the United States. The Cabin John Bridge Hotel was built in 1870 adjacent to the west end of the Union Arch Bridge, overlooking the Potomac. Originally a refreshment stand and boarding house for bridge workers, it grew into "a sumptuous establishment frequented by the most powerful politicians and important social figures of Washington, D.C." In its heyday of the 1890s to early 1900s, "the hotel was so lavish and became so important a destination for Washingtonians that The Washington Post reported about it regularly." The hotel was destroyed by fire in 1931.

The neighborhood was connected by streetcar to Georgetown from 1897 to the 1930s and to Bethesda, Maryland, from about 1900. Streetcar service ended c. 1960.

Bordering Cabin John to the west is Carderock, where in 1936–1939 the U.S. Navy built the David Taylor Model Basin, one of the largest test facilities for ship design in the world. The test basin facility was originally planned for Cabin John, but instead the original 19.27-acre (7.80 ha) site, bought from Mary Ellen Bobinger, widow of the owner of the Cabin John Hotel, was used to build housing for workmen. "The Navy had 125 homes constructed… 100 for white workers and 25 for black." The homes were in two small neighborhoods, Cabin John Gardens, off MacArthur Boulevard, and Carver Road, off Seven Locks Road. The Cabin John Gardens homes were constructed on the site of the former hotel and sold by the government to employees, with the land itself held as a cooperative—the only single-family development of its kind in the county. Carver Road homes were located about 1/3 of a mile to the northwest and originally rented out for $28 a month. "Of the families who moved there, many are still there, as adult children and grandchildren stayed on."

Before the passage of the Fair Housing Act of 1968, racial covenants were used to exclude African Americans and other people of color. For example, a 1924 deed for a property owned by the American Land Company, Inc., of J. S. Tomlinson said, "That no part of said property shall be sold leased, rented or deed to any person or persons of the negro race or other persons of color."

== Geography ==
Cabin John is in southern Montgomery County, less than 4 miles (6 km) northwest of the border of the District of Columbia, and bordered to the south by the Potomac River and the state of Virginia. It contains a section of the Chesapeake and Ohio Canal (C&O), including locks 8 through 12. The community is the access point to Plummers Island in the Potomac, originally owned by the Washington Biologists' Field Club and called "the most thoroughly studied island in North America."

As an unincorporated area, Cabin John's boundaries are not officially defined. Cabin John is, however, recognized by the United States Census Bureau as a census-designated place, and by the United States Geological Survey as a populated place located at 38°58′30″N 77°9′33″W (38.975110, −77.159281). The CDP borders are the Capital Beltway (I-495) to the west and north, Cabin John Parkway to the northeast, and the Maryland–Virginia state line to the south, along the south shore of the Potomac River. The Clara Barton Parkway parallels the Potomac and the C&O Canal, leading southeast into Washington. Downtown is 9 miles (14 km) to the southeast.

According to the census bureau, the Cabin John CDP has a total area of 1.64 square miles (4.25 km^{2}), of which 1.22 square miles (3.16 km^{2}) are land and 0.42 square miles (1.09 km^{2}), or 26.51%, are water.

Before the construction of the Cabin John Parkway in the mid-1960s, the area was considered to extend north to River Road (Maryland Route 190). The Cabin John Parkway is a spur road that connects the Clara Barton Parkway to the Capital Beltway following the Cabin John Creek valley and passing under the Union Arch Bridge. Originally, the banks of the creek nearly reached the full width of the arch, but the parkway required about half the creek's width be converted into roadway.

Historically, Cabin John has been part of the region known as the Potomac Gorge (Potomac Palisades), an approximately 15-mile-long (24 km) corridor or "fall zone" that sees a transition between the hard bedrock of the Piedmont to the softer rocks and soils of the Atlantic Coastal Plain and representing a drop in elevation from 140 feet (43 m) to about 10 feet (3.0 m) above sea level.

== Demographics ==
Historical population
Census	Pop.	Note	%±
2000	1,734		—
2010	2,280		31.5%
2020	2,459		7.9%
U.S. Decennial Census

=== Racial and ethnic composition ===
Cabin John CDP, Maryland – Racial and ethnic composition Note: the US Census treats Hispanic/Latino as an ethnic category. This table excludes Latinos from the racial categories and assigns them to a separate category. Hispanics/Latinos may be of any race.
Race / Ethnicity (NH = Non-Hispanic)	Pop 2000	Pop 2010	Pop 2020	% 2000	% 2010	% 2020
White alone (NH)	1,437	1,820	1,774	82.87%	79.82%	72.14%
Black or African American alone (NH)	60	79	81	3.46%	3.46%	3.29%
Native American or Alaska Native alone (NH)	3	5	0	0.17%	0.22%	0.00%
Asian alone (NH)	152	191	276	8.77%	8.38%	11.22%
Native Hawaiian or Pacific Islander alone (NH)	0	1	2	0.00%	0.04%	0.08%
Other race alone (NH)	3	11	28	0.17%	0.48%	1.14%
Mixed race or Multiracial (NH)	32	69	121	1.85%	3.03%	4.92%
Hispanic or Latino (any race)	47	104	177	2.71%	4.56%	7.20%
Total	1,734	2,280	2,459	100.00%	100.00%	100.00%

=== 2020 census ===
As of the 2020 census, Cabin John had a population of 2,459. The median age was 46.9 years. 24.2% of residents were under the age of 18 and 21.0% of residents were 65 years of age or older. For every 100 females there were 91.2 males, and for every 100 females age 18 and over there were 91.1 males age 18 and over.

100.0% of residents lived in urban areas, while 0.0% lived in rural areas.

There were 891 households in Cabin John, of which 39.2% had children under the age of 18 living in them. Of all households, 68.0% were married-couple households, 8.4% were households with a male householder and no spouse or partner present, and 20.5% were households with a female householder and no spouse or partner present. About 17.5% of all households were made up of individuals and 11.4% had someone living alone who was 65 years of age or older.

There were 916 housing units, of which 2.7% were vacant. The homeowner vacancy rate was 0.7% and the rental vacancy rate was 5.6%.

Racial composition as of the 2020 census
Race	Number	Percent
White	1,827	74.3%
Black or African American	83	3.4%
American Indian and Alaska Native	0	0.0%
Asian	279	11.3%
Native Hawaiian and Other Pacific Islander	2	0.1%
Some other race	41	1.7%
Two or more races	227	9.2%

=== 2000 census ===
At the 2000 census there were 1,734 people, 668 households, and 464 families residing in the area. The population density was 1,762.4 inhabitants per square mile (680.5/km^{2}). There were 688 housing units at an average density of 699.3 per square mile (270.0/km^{2}). The racial makeup of the area was 85.01% White, 3.63% African American, 0.23% Native American, 8.77% Asian, 0.46% from other races, and 1.90% from two or more races. Hispanic or Latino of any race were 2.71%.

Of the 668 households 36.2% had children under the age of 18 living with them, 60.9% were married couples living together, 5.7% had a female householder with no husband present, and 30.5% were non-families. 24.3% of households were one person and 8.5% were one person aged 65 or older. The average household size was 2.60 and the average family size was 3.11.

The age distribution was 25.8% under the age of 18, 4.7% from 18 to 24, 25.3% from 25 to 44, 34.9% from 45 to 64, and 9.3% 65 or older. The median age was 42 years. For every 100 females, there were 94.8 males. For every 100 females age 18 and over, there were 93.0 males.

The median household income was $95,692 and the median family income was $125,493. Males had a median income of $84,112 versus $64,271 for females. The per capita income for the area was $52,401. None of the families and 2.4% of the population were living below the poverty line, including no one under age eighteen and 11.3% of those over 64.

== Notable people ==
- Jon Bernthal (born 1976), actor
- Tom Bernthal (born 1974), news producer and marketer
- Zachary Bookman (born 1980), co-founder of OpenGov
- Wayne Frederick (born 2004), soccer player
- Hugh Gallagher (1932–2004), author and disability activist
- Tom Patrick Green (1942–2012), painter and professor
- Hubert Humphrey (1911–1978), Vice President of the United States
- Andrew E. Rice (1922–2010), founder of the Society for International Development
- John Riggins (born 1949), American football player
- Ian Somerville (born 2000), ice dancer

== See also ==
- Cabin John-Brookmont, a census-designated place delineated in 1980 and 1990
