= Maryland Route 189 =

State highway in Montgomery County, Maryland, United States, known as Falls Road

Maryland Route 189
- Falls Road
- Maryland Route 189 highlighted in red

Route information
- Maintained by MDSHA
- Length: 5.05 mi (8.13 km)
- Existed: 1927–present

Major junctions
- South end: MD 190 in Potomac
- I-270 in Rockville
- North end: Great Falls Road / Maryland Avenue in Rockville

Location
- Country: United States
- State: Maryland
- Counties: Montgomery

Highway system
- Maryland highway system; Interstate; US; State; Scenic Byways
← MD 188	→ MD 190

Maryland Route 189 (MD 189) is a state highway in the U.S. state of Maryland. Known as Falls Road, the highway runs 5.05 miles (8.13 km) from MD 190 in Potomac to Great Falls Road and Maryland Avenue in Rockville. MD 189 connects Rockville with Potomac and the Great Falls of the Potomac River in southwestern Montgomery County. The highway was constructed from Rockville to Potomac by the early 1920s and extended toward Great Falls in the early 1930s. MD 189 was expanded to a divided highway around its newly constructed interchange with Interstate 270 (I-270) in the late 1980s. The highway was truncated at both ends in the late 1990s.

== Route description ==
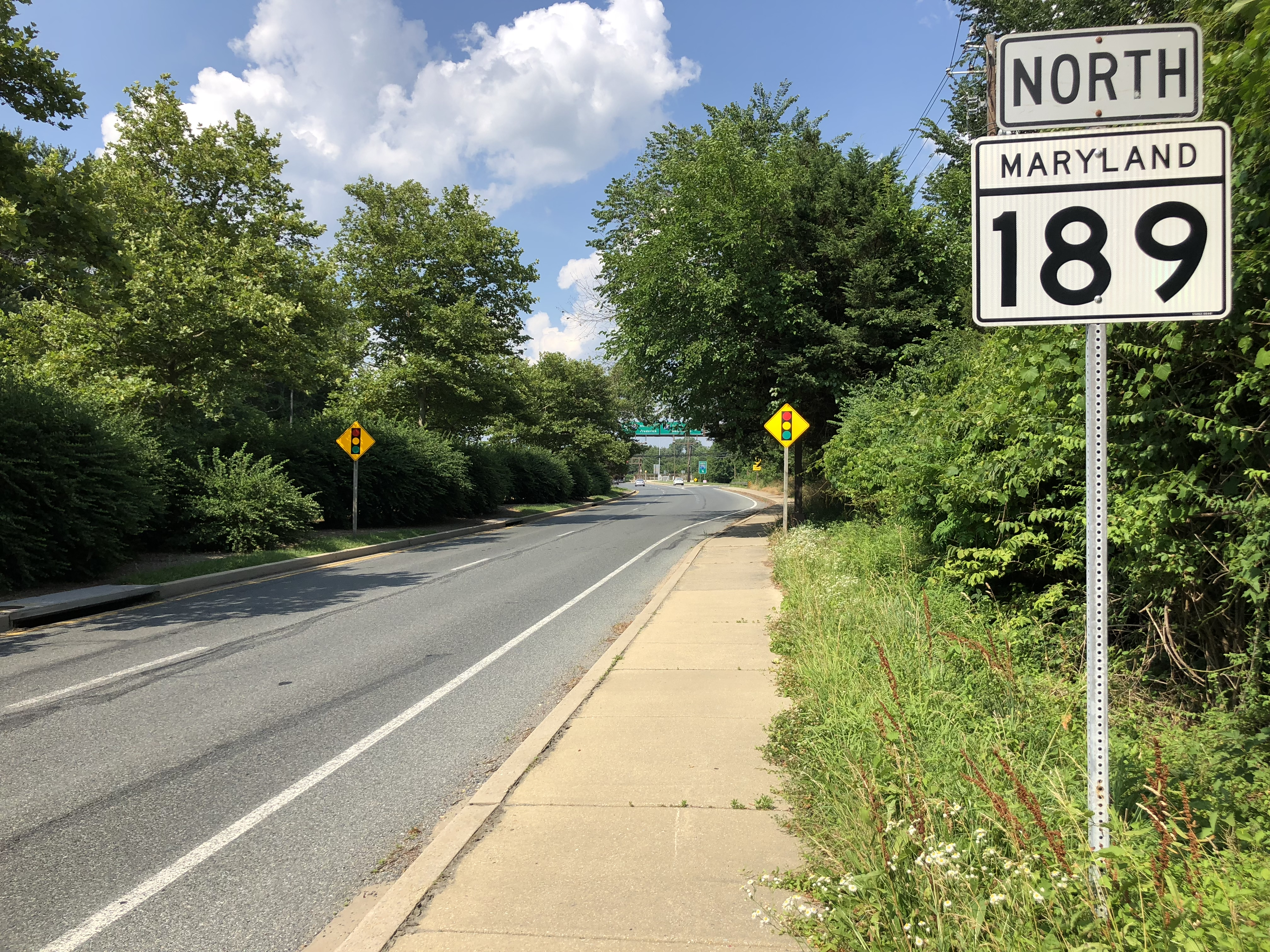
View north along MD 189 at Fallsmead Way in Rockville

MD 189 begins at an intersection with MD 190 (River Road) in the village center of Potomac. Falls Road continues south as a county highway to MacArthur Boulevard and the entrance to the Chesapeake and Ohio Canal National Historical Park, which includes the Great Falls of the Potomac. MD 189 heads north as a two-lane undivided road that passes through several sharp curves between the Bullis School to the southeast and the Falls Road Golf Course to the northwest. The highway meets the western end of Montrose Road shortly before entering the city of Rockville. MD 189 expands to a four-lane divided highway ahead of its intersection with Wootton Parkway. The highway continues through a single-point urban interchange with I-270 (Eisenhower Memorial Highway) shortly before reaching its northern terminus at a four-way intersection with Great Falls Road, Maryland Avenue, and Potomac Valley Road. Great Falls Road (formerly a direct continuation of Falls Road, now a left turn at the intersection) heads north toward the west end of downtown Rockville and Maryland Avenue heads northeast directly toward downtown.

== History ==
MD 189 was paved as an 18-foot-wide (5.5 m) macadam road from Montgomery Avenue (now MD 28) in Rockville to Potomac by 1921. The highway was extended as a concrete road from Potomac to what is now MacArthur Boulevard near Great Falls in 1930. MD 189 did not originally have an interchange with Washington National Pike (now I-270). The highway's single-point urban interchange with I-270 was built in 1988. As part of that project, MD 189 was expanded to a four-lane divided highway from south of Wootton Parkway to Maryland Avenue. The latter intersection was placed in its present form at that time, replacing the seamless transition from Falls Road to Great Falls Road just north of I-270. MD 189 was rolled back from Great Falls to its present southern terminus in Potomac in 1999. The highway was removed from Great Falls Road in Rockville in 2000.

== Major intersections ==
The entire route is in Montgomery County.

Location	mi	km	Destinations	Notes
Potomac	0.00	0.00	MD 190 (River Road) / Falls Road south (C&O Canal Scenic Byway)	Southern terminus; continues south as a tourist route
Potomac	3.34	5.38	Montrose Road to I-270	
Rockville	4.87	7.84	I-270 – Frederick, Washington	Single-point urban interchange; exit 5 on I-270 (Washington National Pike)
Rockville	5.05	8.13	Great Falls Road north / Maryland Avenue east / Potomac Valley Road south	Northern terminus
1.000 mi = 1.609 km; 1.000 km = 0.621 mi
