= MacArthur Boulevard =

MacArthur Boulevard may refer to:

- MacArthur Boulevard (Washington, D.C.), a road that parallels the C&O Canal in Washington, D.C. and Montgomery County, Maryland
- MacArthur Boulevard in Oakland, California, a major boulevard in Oakland and a historical portion of U.S. Route 50 in California, part of which was renamed Tupac Shakur Way

- Interstate 580 (California) in Oakland, California, known as the MacArthur Freeway as it parallels the original U.S. Route 50

- MacArthur Boulevard in Orange County, California, a major boulevard running which was formerly California State Route 73
- MacArthur Boulevard in Bourne, Massachusetts, a four lane divided highway that is a part of Massachusetts Route 28.
