= Hugh Gallagher (advocate) =

American disability rights advocate (1932–2004)

Hugh Gregory Gallagher
- Born: October 18, 1932; Palo Alto, California, US
- Died: July 13, 2004 (aged 71); Washington, D.C., US
- Education: Oxford University
- Known for: Disability advocacy
- Notable work: Architectural Barriers Act of 1968
- Awards: Marshall Scholar, 1956-1959; Woodrow Wilson International Center for Scholars fellowship, 1982; Kennedy Institute of Bioethics scholar, 1987-1989; Henry B. Betts Award, 1995

Hugh Gregory Gallagher (October 18, 1932 – July 13, 2004) was an author and international disability advocate who worked as an aide for two U.S. Senators.

== Early life and education ==
Born in Palo Alto, California, Gallagher grew up in Chicago, New York City and Washington, D.C.

He contracted polio in 1952 at age 19 while studying at Haverford College. Gallagher spent six weeks in an iron lung.

He attended Claremont McKenna College, graduating magna cum laude in 1956. He attended Oxford University on a Marshall Scholarship, graduating with both bachelor's and master's degrees in political science, philosophy and economics.

== Career ==
Beginning in 1959, Gallagher worked as a Congressional aide to Senator John Carroll before becoming administrative assistant to Senator Bob Bartlett in 1962. Gallagher worked on Bartlett's re-election campaign in 1966.

While working for Bartlett, he drafted the Architectural Barriers Act of 1968, which stipulated that buildings built with federal funds provide access for the disabled. The bill was opposed by those concerned about the effect the changes would have on the appearance of the buildings. After it was passed, the Library of Congress, National Gallery of Art, and the Kennedy Center all added accessible facilities.

Bob Dole wrote, "Hugh's most outstanding contribution to the quality of life of people with disabilities was to successfully place disability on the agenda of the Congress for the first time."

Gallagher was a member of the Cosmos Club.

=== Post-Congress ===
Gallagher worked as the state-coordinator for Colorado on Hubert Humphrey's 1968 presidential campaign.

After Bartlett's death, Gallagher went to work for BP, consulting in support of the Trans-Alaska Pipeline System.

== Advocacy ==
From 1995 to 1997, he campaigned to have Franklin D. Roosevelt's memorial depict him in a wheelchair in one of the representations. Gallagher said, "The able-bodied world is stealing our hero." Senator Daniel Inouye stated that the memorial would display one of the rare photographs depicting FDR in a wheelchair; it was also the first such memorial to be designed with wheelchair accessibility.

In 1997, Gallagher wrote an amicus brief in Washington v. Glucksberg in which he stated his support for the terminally ill to have the right to physician-assisted euthanasia.

== Awards ==
- Marshall Scholar, 1956-1959
- Woodrow Wilson International Center for Scholars fellowship, 1982
- Kennedy Institute of Bioethics scholar, 1987-1989
- Henry B. Betts Award, 1995, for work on behalf of disabled people.

== Death ==
Gallagher, who wrote from his home in Cabin John, Maryland, died of cancer in Washington, D.C., on July 13, 2004, aged 71.

== Legacy ==
The Hugh Gallagher Award was created by Peter Kovler to commemorate Gallagher, who used his writing to educate the public about injustices, to promote understanding among diverse populations and to draw people into the choice-in-dying movement. The Award is given annually by Compassion & Choices.

== Books ==
- Advise and Obstruct: The Role of the United States Senate in Foreign Policy Decisions. New York: Delacorte Press. 1969. LCCN 69-11675.
- Etok: A Story of Eskimo Power. New York: G. P. Putnam's Sons. 1974. ISBN 0399112561. LCCN 73-87189.
- FDR's Splendid Deception. New York: Dodd, Mead & Co. 1985. ISBN 9780396085218. LCCN 84-23870.
- By Trust Betrayed: Patients, Physicians and the License to Kill in the Third Reich. New York: Henry Holt and Company. 1990. ISBN 9780918339362. LCCN 89-11136.
- Black Bird Fly Away: Disabled in an Able-Bodied World. Arlington: Vandamere Press. 1998. ISBN 9780918339447.
- Nothing to Fear: FDR in Photographs. Clearwater, FL: Vandamere Press. 2001. ISBN 0918339561.
