= Cabin John Parkway =

County highway in Montgomery County, Maryland, US

- Cabin John Parkway highlighted in red

Route information
- Maintained by MDSHA
- Length: 1.50 mi (2.41 km)
- Existed: 1965–present
- Component highways: I-495X (unsigned) entire length
- Restrictions: No trucks

Major junctions
- South end: Clara Barton Parkway in Cabin John
- North end: I-495 / MD 190 in Bethesda

Location
- Country: United States
- State: Maryland
- Counties: Montgomery

Highway system
- Maryland highway system; Interstate; US; State; Scenic Byways

The Cabin John Parkway is a controlled-access parkway in the U.S. state of Maryland. The parkway runs 1.50 miles (2.41 km) from the Clara Barton Parkway in Cabin John north to Interstate 495 (I-495) in Bethesda in southwestern Montgomery County. Cabin John Parkway is a four-lane freeway that serves as a connector between the Clara Barton Parkway in the direction of Washington, D.C., and I-495 in the direction of Rockville and Silver Spring. The parkway was constructed in the mid-1960s and passes under the historic Union Arch Bridge, the longest masonry arch span in America.

== Route description ==
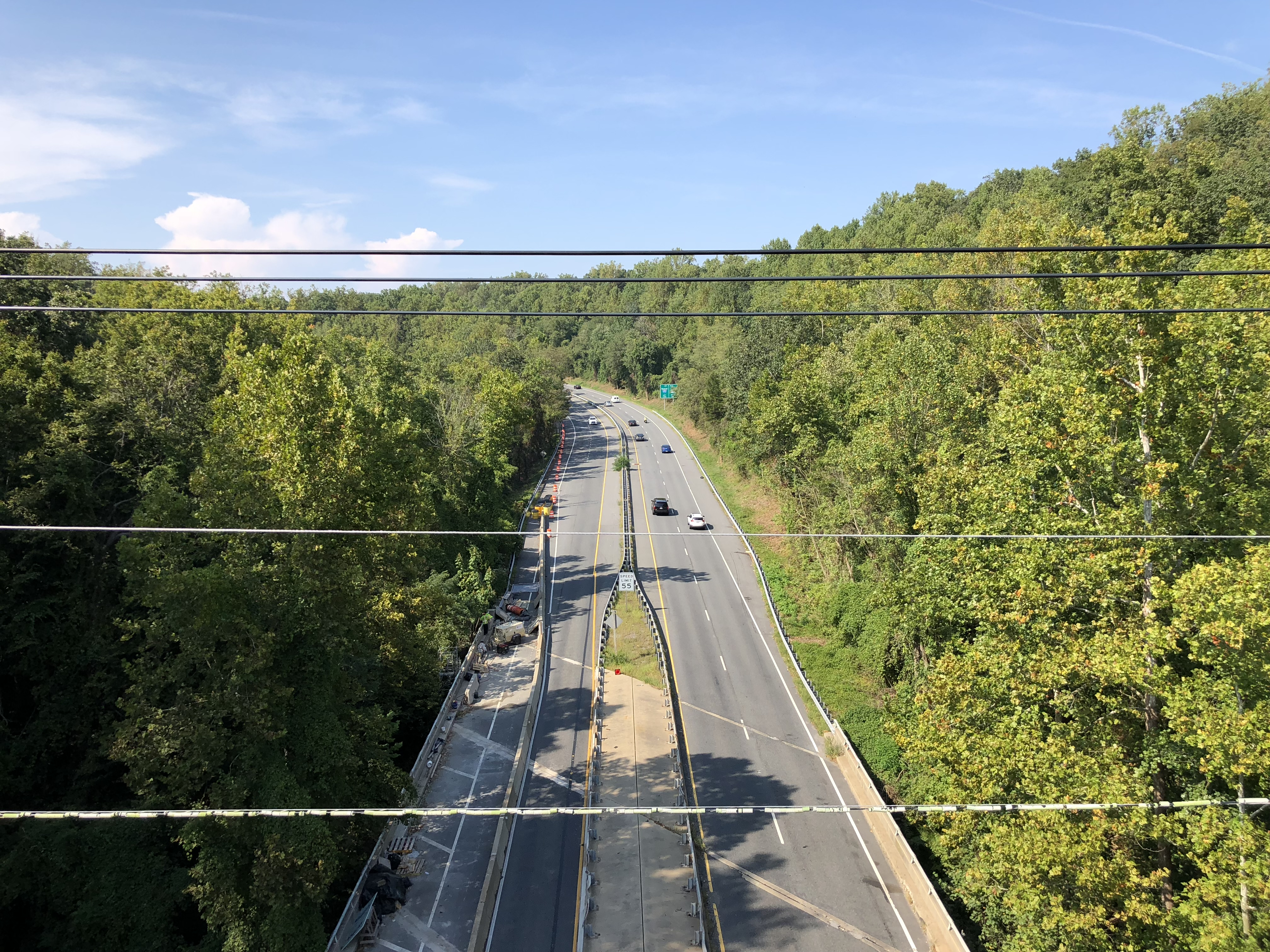
View north along the Cabin John Parkway from the Union Arch Bridge

The Cabin John Parkway begins at a partial interchange with the Clara Barton Parkway in the unincorporated area of Cabin John. The interchange allows access from the Cabin John Parkway to the Clara Barton Parkway eastbound and from the Clara Barton Parkway westbound to the Cabin John Parkway. Each direction of the parkway crosses Cabin John Creek before the roadways come together to pass under the Union Arch Bridge, which carries the Washington Aqueduct and MacArthur Boulevard. The Cabin John Parkway crosses Cabin John Creek again before continuing north as a four-lane freeway with a speed limit of 55 mph (89 km/h) through a forested corridor paralleling the creek. After crossing Booze Creek, the two directions of the parkway divide toward their terminuses at I-495 (Capital Beltway) in Bethesda. The northbound direction of the Cabin John Parkway splits into single-lane ramps for northbound I-495 and I-495's interchange with Maryland Route 190 (MD 190; River Road). The southbound parkway is formed by ramps from southbound I-495 and MD 190.

The Cabin John Parkway is maintained by the Maryland State Highway Administration and has an internal designation of Interstate 495X (I-495X). Trucks are prohibited on the parkway. The Cabin John Parkway is a part of the National Highway System as a principal arterial for its entire length.

== History ==
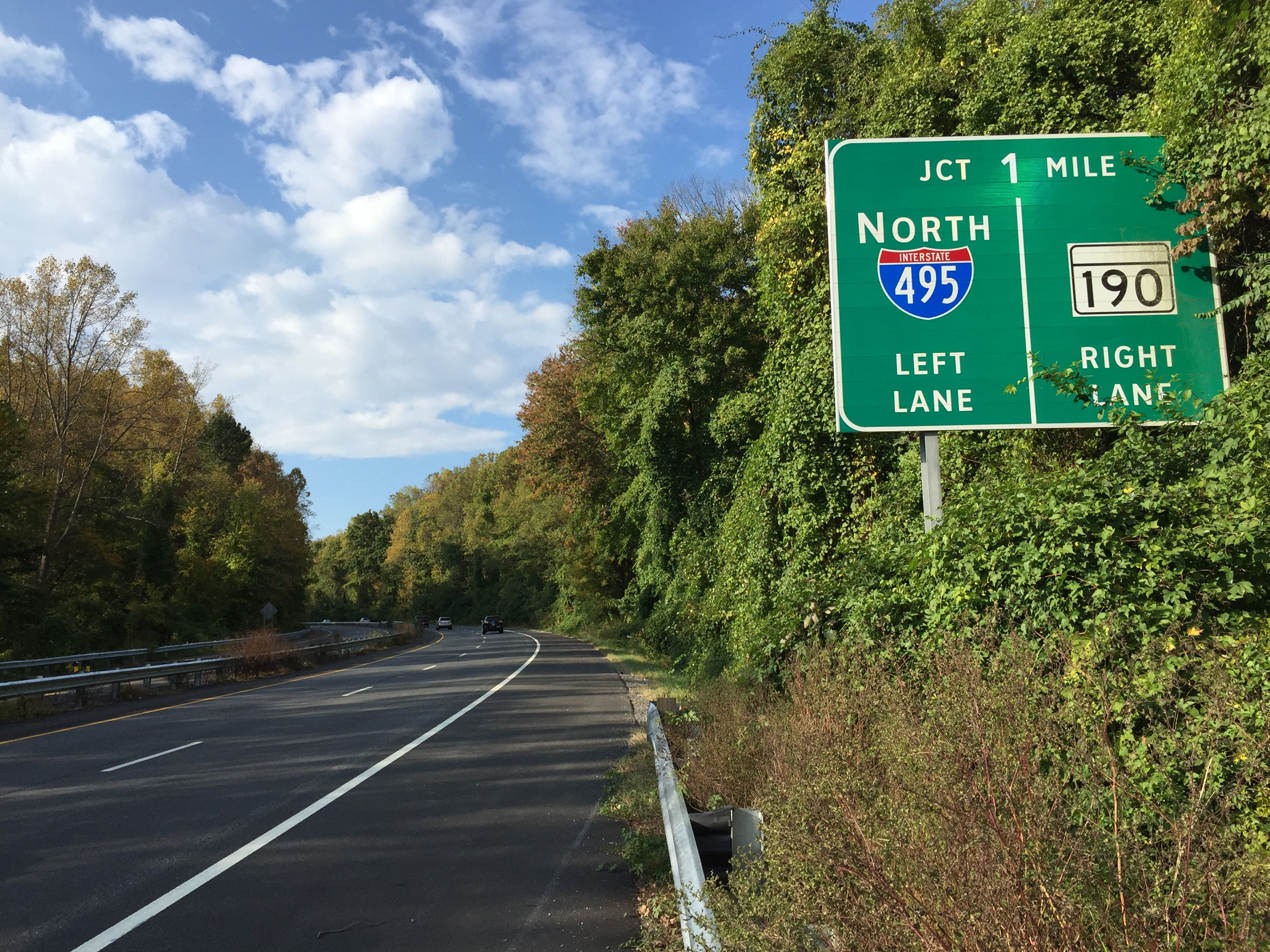
View north along Cabin John Parkway near the Clara Barton Parkway

Construction on Cabin John Parkway began in 1962 when I-495's bridge across Cabin John Creek and the southbound ramp to the parkway was built. Work on the remainder of the parkway was underway by 1963. Cabin John Parkway opened in 1965 when the Clara Barton Parkway (then known as the Maryland portion of the George Washington Parkway) from the Cabin John interchange east to the MacArthur Boulevard interchange opened.

== Exit list ==
The entire parkway is in Montgomery County. All exits are unnumbered.

Location	mi	km	Destinations	Notes
Cabin John	0.00	0.00	Clara Barton Parkway east – Glen Echo, Washington	Southern terminus; one-way peak-direction road during rush hours
Bethesda	1.28	2.06	MD 190 (River Road) – Potomac, Washington	Northbound exit and southbound entrance
Bethesda	1.50	2.41	I-495 north (Capital Beltway) – Silver Spring	Northern terminus; exit 40 on I-495
1.000 mi = 1.609 km; 1.000 km = 0.621 mi: Incomplete access
