= Maryland Route 190 =

Highway in Maryland, United States

Maryland Route 190
- River Road
- Maryland Route 190 highlighted in red

Route information
- Maintained by MDSHA
- Length: 15.88 mi (25.56 km)
- Existed: 1927–present
- Tourist routes: Chesapeake and Ohio Canal Scenic Byway

Major junctions
- West end: MD 112 near Seneca
- MD 189 in Potomac; MD 191 in Potomac; I-495 / Cabin John Parkway near Bethesda; MD 188 in Bethesda; MD 614 in Bethesda
- East end: Western Avenue NW at the District of Columbia boundary in Bethesda

Location
- Country: United States
- State: Maryland

Highway system
- Maryland highway system; Interstate; US; State; Scenic Byways
← MD 189	→ MD 191

Maryland Route 190 (MD 190) is a state highway in the U.S. state of Maryland. Known as River Road, the highway runs 15.88 miles (25.56 km) from MD 112 near Seneca east to Western Avenue at the District of Columbia boundary in Bethesda. MD 190 parallels the Potomac River through the affluent southwestern Montgomery County communities of Potomac and Bethesda and connects those suburbs with Interstate 495 (I-495). River Road was paved from Washington, D.C. west through part of Bethesda in the early 1910s. A second section of MD 190 was constructed through Potomac in the mid-1920s. The Bethesda and Potomac portions of the route were unified in the late 1920s. MD 190 was extended west toward Seneca in two steps in 1950 and the early 1970s. The highway was expanded to a four-lane divided highway through Bethesda in the early 1960s.

The westernmost 8.14 miles (13.10 km) of MD 190 are signed concurrently with the Chesapeake and Ohio Canal Scenic Byway, a state tourist route.

== Route description ==
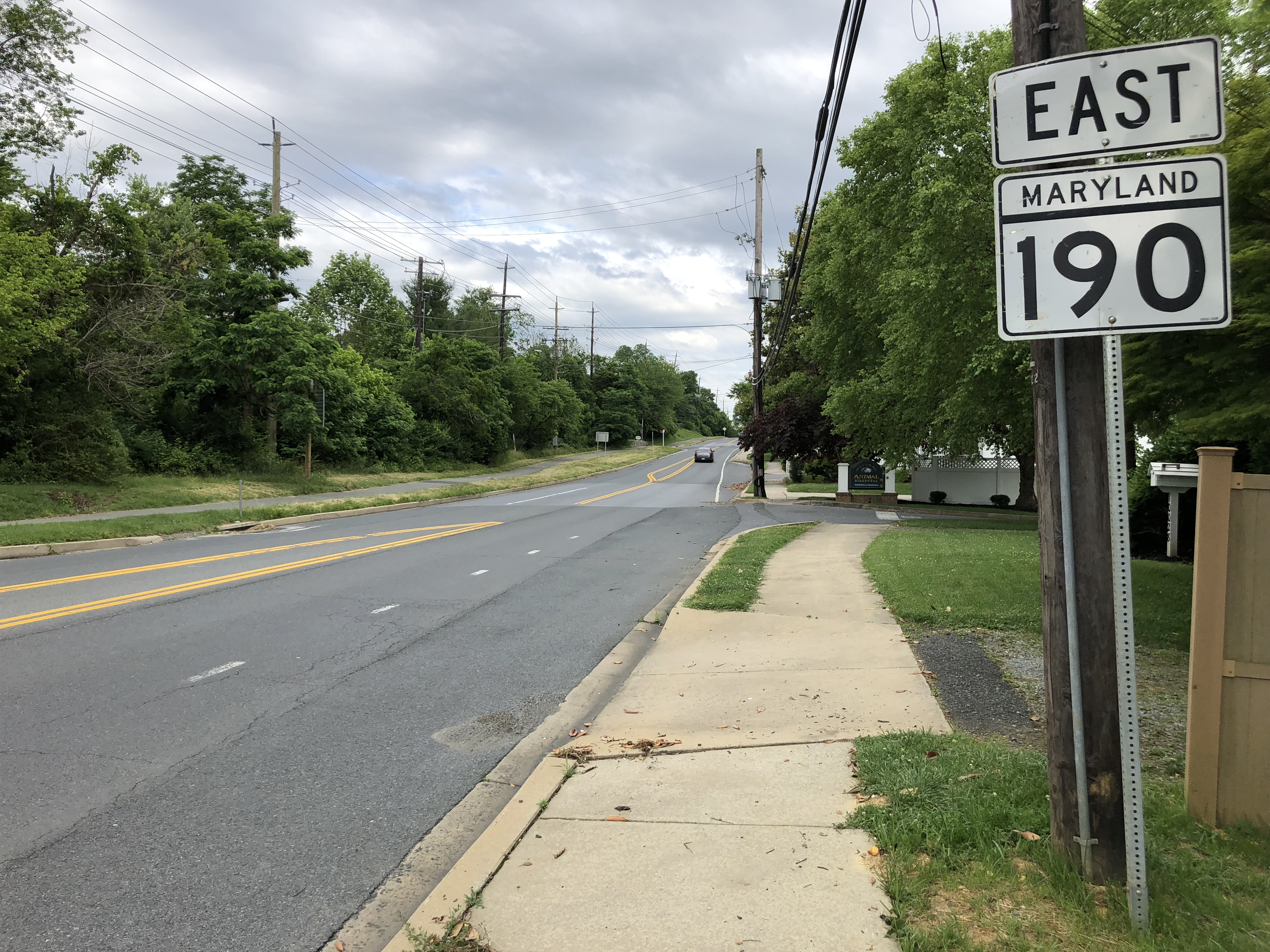
View east along MD 190 in Potomac

MD 190 begins at a three-way intersection just east of the hamlet of Seneca near the mouth of Seneca Creek at the Potomac River. The east leg of the intersection is MD 112 (Seneca Road), which heads toward Darnestown. The west leg of the intersection is county-maintained River Road, which parallels the river through the Seneca Historic District and peters out beyond McKee-Beshers Wildlife Management Area south of Poolesville. MD 190 heads southeast as a two-lane undivided road that parallels the Potomac River from a distance. The road intersects several county highways that provide access to the Chesapeake and Ohio Canal National Historical Park. The highway crosses Muddy Branch within Blockhouse Point Park and continues through the Travilah area, where the highway intersects Travilah Road. MD 190 crosses Watts Branch west of Piney Meetinghouse Road, where the Potomac River curves south away from the highway. The route crosses Rock Run as it enters the village of Potomac, where the highway temporarily expands to four lanes and intersects Falls Road, which heads north as MD 189 and south toward Great Falls. MD 190 passes to the north of the TPC Potomac at Avenel Farm golf course and intersects Bradley Boulevard, which carries MD 191 north of MD 190, west of the entrance to Congressional Country Club.

MD 190 crosses Cabin John Creek and expands to a four-lane divided highway just west of Seven Locks Road. The state highway has a partial cloverleaf interchange with I-495 (Capital Beltway) that includes access to Cabin John Parkway. East of the Capital Beltway, the route becomes a partially controlled access highway, with adjacent properties accessed by service roads or intersecting streets. MD 190 passes to the south of the Burning Tree Club and the Holton-Arms School before crossing Booze Creek. The highway continues through the southern part of Bethesda, where the road intersects MD 188 (Wilson Lane) and MD 614 (Goldsboro Road); between the two highways, the highway passes south of Walt Whitman High School. MD 190 loses access of control and becomes an undivided road with a center left-turn lane west of its underpass of the Capital Crescent Trail. The highway becomes an undivided four-lane road between its intersection with Little Falls Parkway and its crossing of Little Falls Branch. MD 190 reaches its eastern terminus at Western Avenue at the District of Columbia boundary. River Road continues into Washington, D.C. as a two-lane unnumbered street that ends at Wisconsin Avenue in Tenleytown.

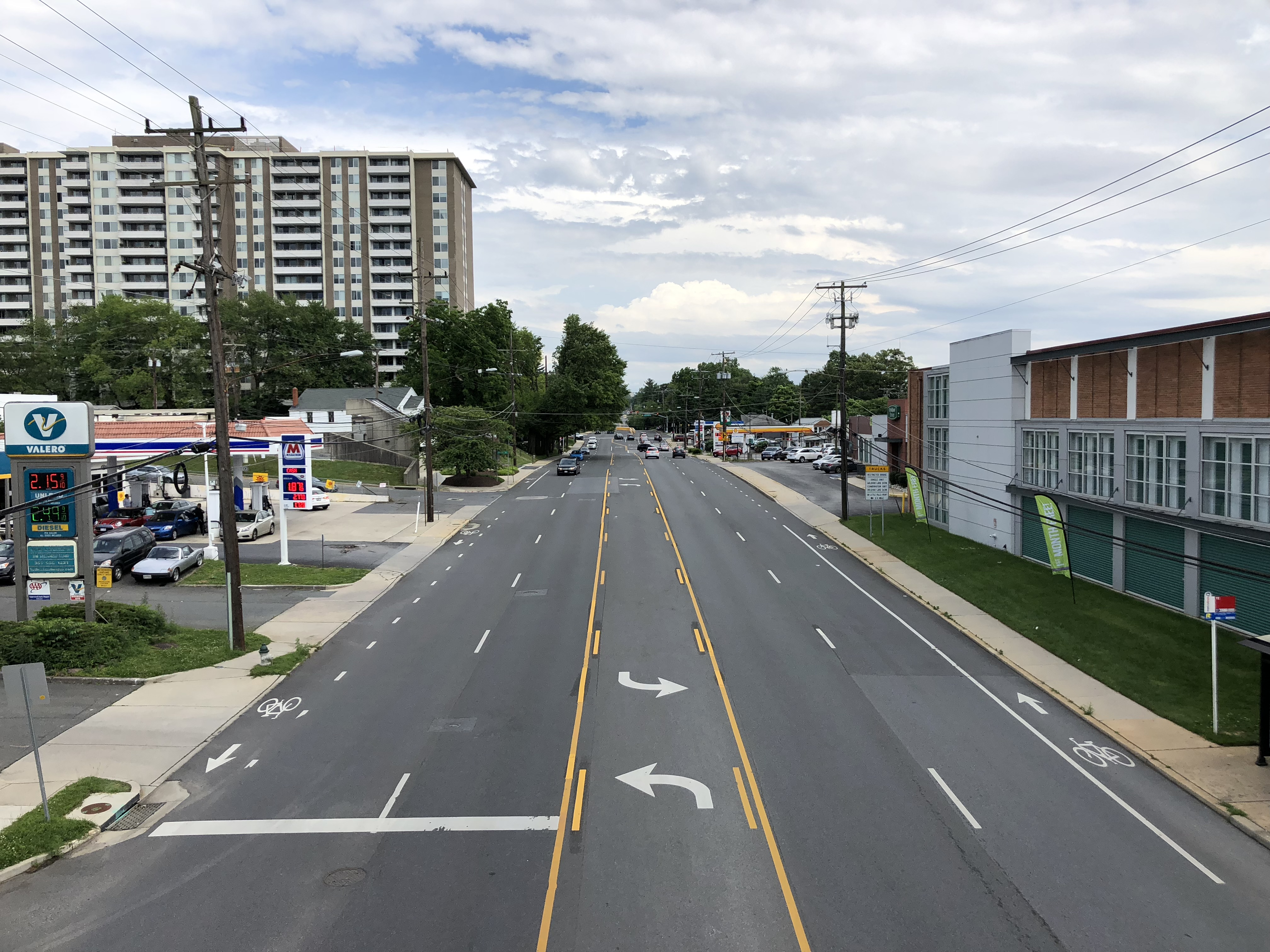
View east along MD 190 from the Capital Crescent Trail in Bethesda

MD 190 is a part of the National Highway System as a principal arterial from MD 189 in Potomac to its eastern terminus.

== History ==
The first section of River Road to be paved was from the District of Columbia boundary west to Wilson Lane at the hamlet of Cohasset. Montgomery County applied for state aid for the road by 1910; it was built as a 10-foot-wide (3.0 m) macadam road by 1915. A second section of macadam road was built from Bradley Lane to a point just west of Potomac by 1923. The western section was extended as a concrete road from Potomac to near Piney Meetinghouse Road in 1925 and 1926. A third segment of MD 190 was built as a concrete road from Cabin John Creek to Booze Creek in 1928. The original extent of the state highway was finished when the gaps in the highway between Bradley Lane and Wilson Lane were filled with macadam roadway by 1930. MD 190 was extended west from Piney Meetinghouse Road to Travilah Road, which was then MD 421, in 1950. River Road from MD 421 to MD 112 was completely reconstructed as a federal aid project for Montgomery County between 1954 and 1956. This improved road was brought into the state system as the westernmost portion of MD 190 in 1974. MD 190 was expanded to a four-lane divided highway from just west of the I-495 interchange east to the Georgetown Branch railroad crossing in 1963, the same year the highway's interchange with I-495 opened. The Capital Crescent Trail's bridge across MD 190 was completed in 1996.

== Major intersections ==
The entire route is in Montgomery County.

Location	mi	km	Destinations	Notes
Seneca	0.00	0.00	MD 112 east (Seneca Road) – Darnestown	Western terminus; western terminus of MD 112
Potomac	8.14	13.10	MD 189 north (Falls Road) – Rockville, Great Falls	Southern terminus of MD 189
Potomac	10.02	16.13	MD 191 north (Bradley Boulevard) / Bradley Boulevard west	Southern terminus of MD 191
Bethesda	11.52	18.54	I-495 / Cabin John Parkway south (I-495X south) – Northern Virginia, Frederick, Baltimore	Exit 39 on I-495 (Capital Beltway); Cabin John Pkwy. not signed
Bethesda	12.71	20.45	MD 188 (Wilson Lane) – Glen Echo	
Bethesda	13.83	22.26	MD 614 (Goldsboro Road)	
Bethesda	15.90	25.59	Western Avenue NW	District of Columbia border; eastern terminus
1.000 mi = 1.609 km; 1.000 km = 0.621 mi: Concurrency terminus

== Auxiliary route ==
MD 190A is the designation for the unnamed 0.01-mile (0.016 km) connector between MD 190 and the River Road Service Drive between Orkney Parkway and Braeburn Parkway in Bethesda.
