= Carderock, Maryland =

Community in Montgomery County, Maryland, US

Coordinates: 38°58′39″N 77°11′40″W

Carderock is an unincorporated community in Montgomery County, Maryland, United States, along the Potomac River. It is located in the southern part of the Potomac census-designated place and western part of the Bethesda postal area.

Carderock is well known for Carderock Division of the Naval Surface Warfare Center and rock climbing at Carderock Recreation Area, part of Chesapeake and Ohio Canal National Historical Park. Carderock also includes a local school (Carderock Springs Elementary), Carderock Springs Swim and Tennis Club, and Congressional Country Club.

Despite its proximity to the Capital Beltway, Carderock remains only moderately developed and traffic congested. This is due in part to the prominent presence of Rock Run, the Naval Surface Warfare Center, and Congressional Country Club. In addition, almost no roads running through Carderock have direct access to the Beltway. The only exceptions are River Road on the north end of the neighborhood and Clara Barton Parkway on the south end.
