= Clara Barton National Historic Site =

National Historic Site of the United States

- U.S. National Register of Historic Places
- U.S. National Historic Landmark
- U.S. National Historic Site
- The Clara Barton House

- Location within Maryland Location within the United States
- Location: 5801 Oxford Rd., Glen Echo, Maryland
- Coordinates: 38°58′1″N 77°8′27″W
- Area: 9 acres (3.6 ha)
- Built: 1891
- Architect: Julian B. Hubbell
- Visitation: 11,309 (2025)
- Website: Clara Barton National Historic Site.
- NRHP reference No.: 66000037

Significant dates
- Added to NRHP: October 15, 1966
- Designated NHL: January 12, 1965
- Designated NHS: 1974

The Clara Barton National Historic Site, which includes the Clara Barton House, was established in 1974 to interpret the life of Clara Barton (1821–1912), an American pioneer teacher, nurse, and humanitarian who was the founder of the American Red Cross. The site is located 2 miles (3.2 km) northwest of Washington, D.C., in Glen Echo, Maryland.

The United States National Historic Site protects 9 acres (0.04 km^{2}) of land at her Glen Echo home including the 38-room former residence of Barton. The site is managed by the George Washington Memorial Parkway, a unit of the National Park Service. The first national historic site dedicated to the accomplishments of a woman, it preserves the early history of the American Red Cross and the last home of its founder. Barton spent the last 15 years of her life in her Glen Echo home (1897–1912), and it served as an early headquarters of the American Red Cross as well.

== Description ==
The large frame house was partially constructed from lumber salvaged from emergency buildings built by the Red Cross at Johnstown, Pennsylvania in the wake of the Johnstown Flood of 1889. The lumber of the dismantled buildings was brought to Washington via the Chesapeake and Ohio Canal to avoid flooding the local market in Johnstown. The lumber was stored on a lot owned by Barton in Washington, D.C., until early in 1891 when construction began on land donated by Edwin and Edward Baltzley, who were developing a Chautauqua assembly at Glen Echo. The house was designed by Dr. Julian B. Hubbell, the first field agent of the American Red Cross. Hubbell oversaw the construction work performed by Baltzley's construction team. The original structure included a massive stone front in a style in keeping with the rest of the Chautauqua buildings. In 1897, when Barton moved into the house permanently, the central part of the stone facade was dismantled, creating flanking stone towers. The addition of pointed roofs accentuated the effect on the deep, narrow house.

In spite of its massive size, the house is sparely detailed and furnished for utility. The interior is designed as if it were a Mississippi River steamboat. The house contains 36 rooms and 38 closets, with three tiers of rooms facing a central gallery lighted by clerestory windows of colored glass. After Barton's death, alterations were made to the interior, creating eight apartments. The Friends of Clara Barton purchased the house in 1963.

Congress designated the Clara Barton House as a National Historic Landmark in 1965, and it was listed on the National Register of Historic Places in 1966. The property was designated as a National Historic Site in 1974.

== Acquisition and restoration ==
The National Park Service (NPS) acquired the house from the Friends of Clara Barton in 1975. The Friends organization had made repairs to the house, but NPS determined that additional structural repairs were needed. The NPS restored 11 rooms, including the Red Cross offices, parlors and Clara Barton's bedroom. In 1981, a dedication ceremony was held at the site.

Guided tours led visitors through the three levels, offering a sense of how Barton lived and worked in her unusual home, surrounded by all that went into her life's work. In 2005, 12,529 visitors toured the site.

In October 2015, the site was closed for additional repairs and remained closed, due to the COVID-19 pandemic, through 2021. The house reopened to the public in 2022, although NPS has identified additional structural problems. The second and third floors of the house remain closed.

== See also ==
- List of National Historic Landmarks in Maryland
- National Register of Historic Places listings in Montgomery County, Maryland
