= MacArthur Boulevard (Washington, D.C.) =

Road in Washington, D.C., and Maryland

- Interactive map of MacArthur Boulevard
- Former name: Conduit Road
- Namesake: Douglas MacArthur
- Length: 12.9 mi (20.8 km)
- Tourist routes: C&O Canal Scenic Byway
- Restrictions: No commercial vehicles over 4 wheels or 6 tons in Maryland
- West end: Chesapeake and Ohio Canal National Historical Park
- Major junctions: Clara Barton Parkway in Potomac, MD; MD 614 in Bethesda, MD
- East end: Foxhall Road in Washington, DC

MacArthur Boulevard is a road in Montgomery County, Maryland, and Washington, D.C. The road follows a northwest–southeast route from the Great Falls area of the Chesapeake and Ohio Canal National Historical Park in Potomac, Maryland, to Foxhall Road NW and 44th Street NW in the Foxhall neighborhood of Washington, D.C., near the Georgetown Reservoir. MacArthur Boulevard runs parallel to the Clara Barton Parkway and the C&O Canal for most of its route, passing through the Palisades area of the District. In Cabin John, traffic is reduced to a single alternating lane as it passes over the Union Arch Bridge, the longest span masonry arch bridge in the Western Hemisphere, and which also carries the Washington Aqueduct.

== History ==
The road was originally named Conduit Road, as it was built atop the Washington Aqueduct. The aqueduct delivers water from the Potomac River to the Dalecarlia Reservoir, which is the primary source of drinking water in the District of Columbia.

The road was renamed for General Douglas MacArthur on March 5, 1942, when a local resident living off the road proposed the name change to his friend, Texas representative Luther Alexander Johnson, who sponsored the bill in Congress.

== Bike path ==
In 1975, a bike path, the MacArthur Boulevard Bike Trail, was built along MacArthur Boulevard from Berma Road to the south driveway for the Defense Mapping Agency Topographic Center (DMATC), a short distance from the District line. In 2013, the county began a project to rebuild the road and bikeway to make it safer and more pleasant. The project widened the existing road by four feet (1.2 m) to provide three-foot (0.91 m) bike lanes in each direction and rebuild the bikeway with a five-foot-wide (1.5 m) vegetative buffer. Segment 2, between I-495 and Oberlin Road, was completed in 2014. Segment 3, between Oberlin and DC is scheduled to begin construction in 2025. Segment 1 will rebuild the road and trail between I-495 and Berma Road.

== Major intersections ==
State/district	County	Location	mi	km	Destinations	Notes
Maryland	Montgomery	Potomac	0.0	0.0	Chesapeake and Ohio Canal National Historical Park	Dead end near Great Falls
Maryland	Montgomery	Potomac	1.3	2.1	Falls Road / C&O Canal Scenic Byway west	Scenic byway continues west
Maryland	Montgomery	Potomac	3.5	5.6	Clara Barton Parkway east / C&O Canal Scenic Byway east to I-495	Western terminus of Clara Barton Parkway; scenic byway continues east
Maryland	Montgomery	Cabin John	6.5	10.5	Clara Barton Parkway to I-495 – Washington	Access via Clara Barton Access Road
Maryland	Montgomery	Cabin John Creek	6.6– 6.7	10.6– 10.8	Union Arch Bridge	
Maryland	Montgomery	Glen Echo–Bethesda line	6.8	10.9	Wilson Lane (MD 188 east)	Western terminus of MD 188
Maryland	Montgomery	Glen Echo–Bethesda line	7.4	11.9	MD 614 north (Goldsboro Road)	Traffic circle; southern terminus of MD 614
Maryland	Montgomery	Glen Echo	7.7	12.4	Clara Barton Parkway west to I-495	Signalized with pedestrian/bike crosswalk and non-turning west-bound lane
			9.8	15.8	District of Columbia–Maryland border	
District of Columbia	City of Washington		12.9	20.8	Foxhall Road NW / 44th Street NW – Downtown	Eastbound traffic can only access Foxhall Road south.
1.000 mi = 1.609 km; 1.000 km = 0.621 mi: Incomplete access; Route transition
