= Union Arch Bridge =

Historic masonry structure in Maryland, U.S.

- U.S. National Register of Historic Places
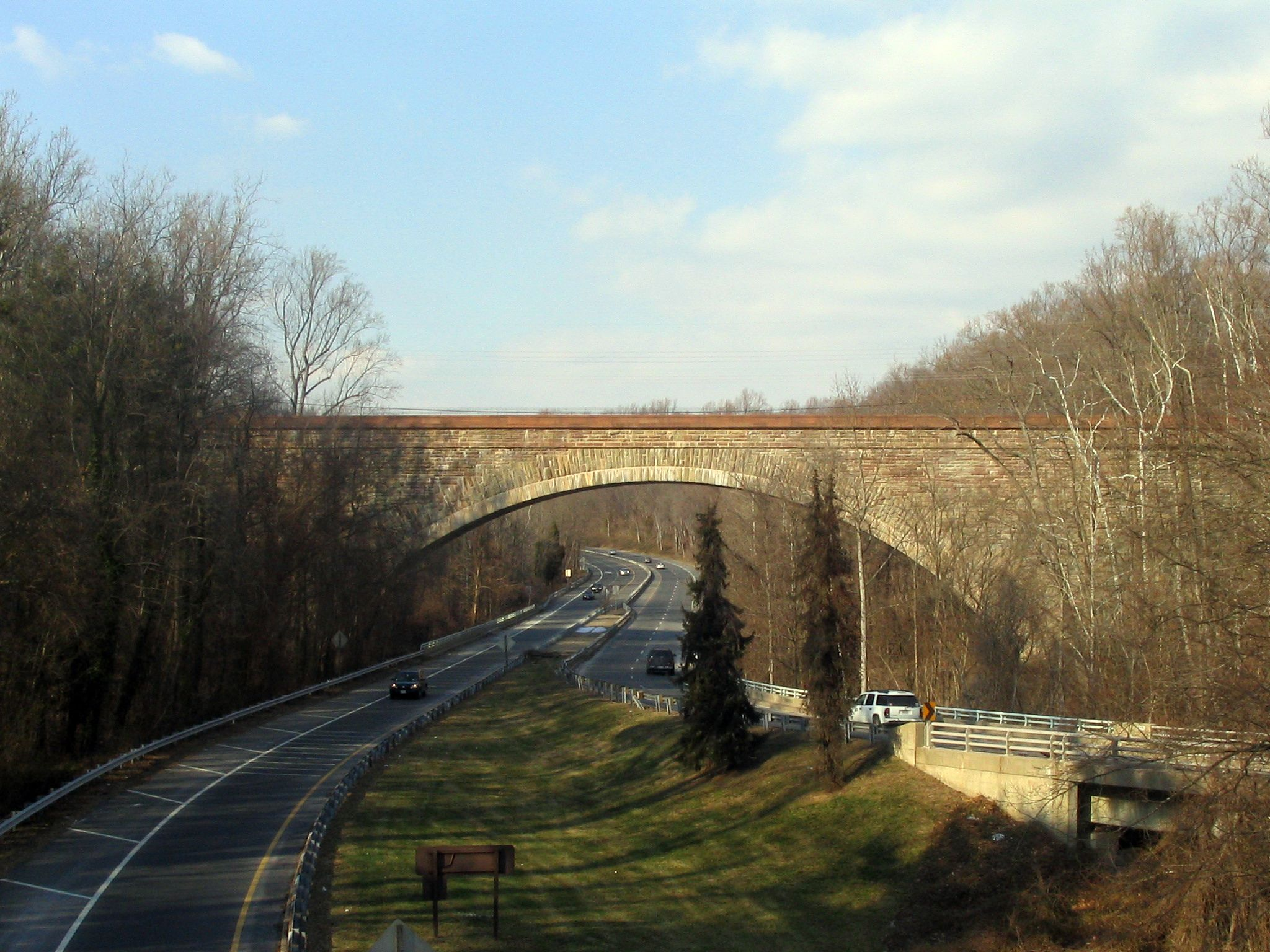
- Union Arch Bridge in 2008. The Cabin John Parkway is seen running underneath the bridge.
- Location: Cabin John, Maryland
- Coordinates: 38°58′22.28″N 77°8′52.69″W
- Built: 1857–1864
- Architect: Meigs, Montgomery C.
- NRHP reference No.: 73000932
- Added to NRHP: February 28, 1973; 53 years ago

The Union Arch Bridge, also called the Cabin John Bridge, is a historic masonry structure in Cabin John, Maryland. It was designed as part of the Washington Aqueduct. The bridge construction began in 1857 and was completed in 1864. The roadway surface was added later. The bridge was designed by Alfred Landon Rives and built by the United States Army Corps of Engineers under the direction of Lieutenant Montgomery C. Meigs.

The Union Arch Bridge was designated as a National Historic Civil Engineering Landmark by the American Society of Civil Engineers in 1972 and was listed in the National Register of Historic Places in 1973.

== Bridge design ==
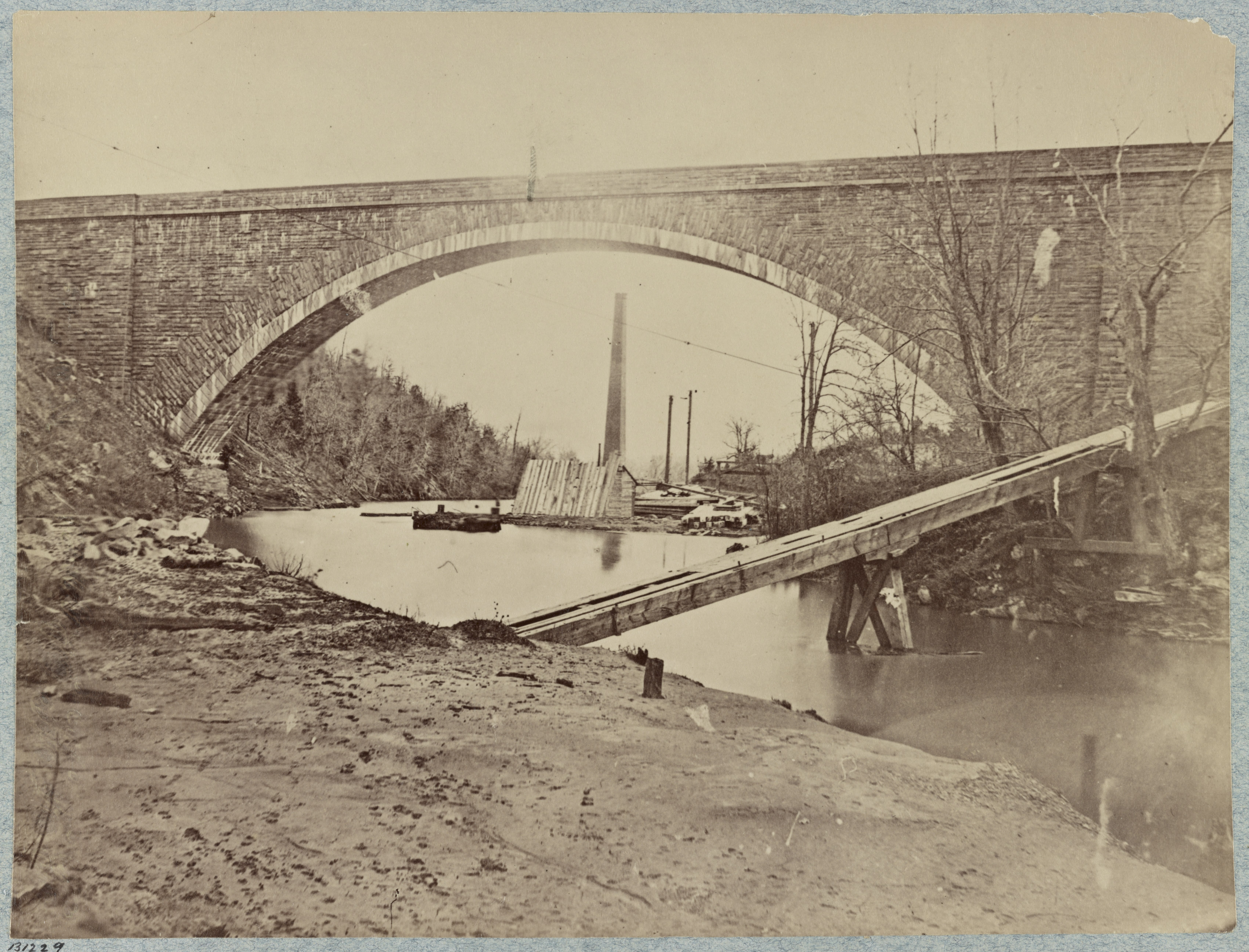
Cabin John Bridge c.1864, without the sandstone parapet

The bridge, with an overall length of 450 ft (140 m) and width of 20 ft (6.1 m), is constructed of Massachusetts granite with a parapet of red sandstone quarried at the nearby Seneca Quarry. The main arch span is 220 ft (67 m) long and rises 57 feet 3 inches (17.45 m) to reach 101 ft (31 m) above Cabin John Creek. The bridge has an internal spandrel wall structure that contains nine additional smaller arches, which are concealed from view by exterior stone sidewalls. When completed in 1864, the main span was the longest single-span masonry arch in the world. (It displaced the visually similar 1832 Grosvenor Bridge in Chester, England, and retained that distinction until the 1903 opening of the 277-foot (84 m) span of the Pont Adolphe Bridge in Luxembourg.)

The bridge was not intended to support traffic and so, when it was built, the conduit was only covered with soft clay and lacked a parapet. However, soon after its completion, farmers began to use the bridge to bring produce to market. The bridge also began to be used for the transit of equipment to repair the conduit itself. "Between 1870 and 1875, a $46,000 appropriation allowed the road to have macadam topping for about a mile." As part of these works, the red sandstone parapet was added.

The parapet attracted daredevil cyclists. A well-documented instance was by McAnney in 1886 on an American Star bicycle. Such activities have been stopped by the railings installed in 2001.

Although Washington's population of about 58,000 was estimated to need 5,220,000 gallons per day, the conduit was designed for a daily capacity of 76,500,000 gallons.

In the summer of 2001, the narrow roadway underwent extensive renovations, partially due to vehicles bumping and damaging the low, unreinforced stone parapet, particularly in the middle of the span where the bridge further narrows. The renovation added a pedestrian/bike lane, providing continuity for the MacArthur Boulevard Bike Trail. On the vehicle side of the roadway, a concrete curb was added to reinforce and protect the stone parapet. A low modular concrete barrier separates vehicles from pedestrians and bikes. Integrated drainage and a simple balustrade of wrought iron railing was added to both sides, protection which had not previously existed.

== Controversy ==
The naming of the bridge has been somewhat confused, related to its completion during the Civil War.

=== Union Arch inscription ===
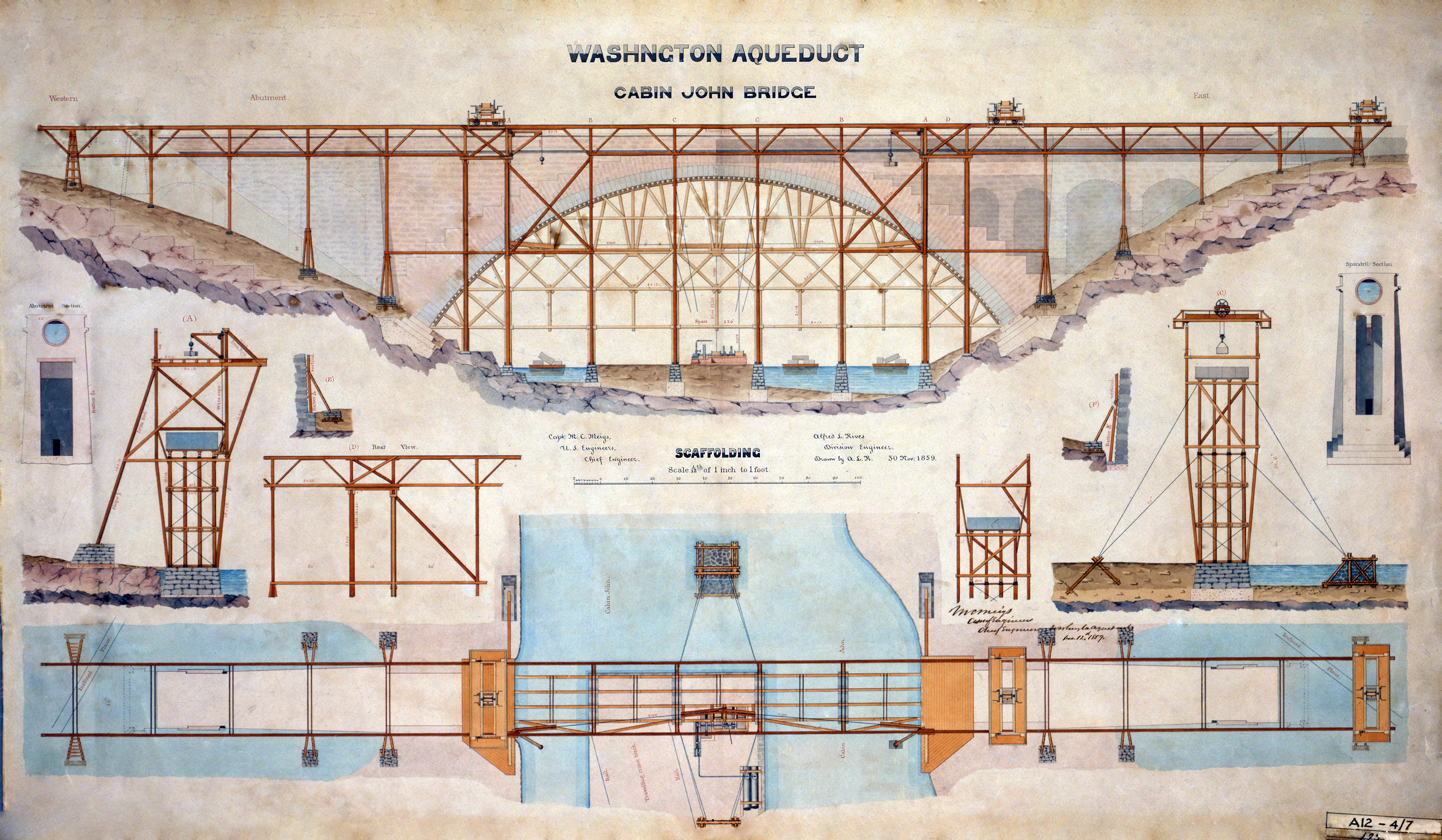
Illustration of Construction Scaffolding, prepared by Assistant Engineer Alfred L. Rives in 1859.

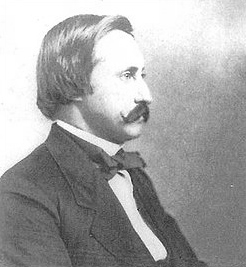
Alfred Landon Rives (b. 1830), designer of the Union Arch Bridge.

While the bridge was being designed and constructed, it was referred to as "Union Arch", "Bridge No. 4" or "Cabin John Bridge" in drawings and government correspondence. The latter two names, however, do not appear in any of the stone carvings that were eventually placed on the bridge. In 1861, as the bridge was nearing completion, the Army drew up initial plans for inscription of commemorative stone tablets to be installed on the bridge. Meigs, who had been promoted to the rank of captain, issued an order in March 1861 for a tablet on the east bridge abutment. The text was to consist of a title, "Union Bridge," and the names of the principal designers, namely Meigs and Assistant Engineer Alfred L. Rives. By the time the war began, however, Rives had joined the Confederate Army. The final tablet design was modified with the title "Union Arch" and "Alfred L. Rives" was replaced with "Esto Perpetua" ("Let it last forever.").

Several publications have referred to the "Union Arch" of the Washington Aqueduct, but others refer to the structure as the Cabin John Bridge.

=== Jefferson Davis inscription ===
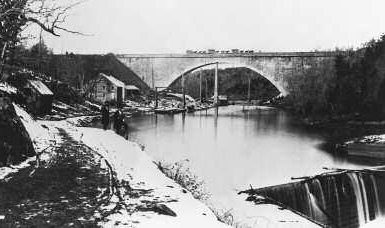
Union Arch Bridge, spanning Cabin John Creek, in 1863.

The bridge design process had begun in 1853, during the administration of President Franklin Pierce and the Secretary of War, Jefferson Davis. Captain Meigs' 1861 order also called for a tablet on the west bridge abutment, with the title, "Washington Aqueduct" and listing the political leaders that were in office both at the start of the project and at its completion (i.e., Pierce and Davis; President Abraham Lincoln and Secretary of War Simon Cameron). By 1862, however, Davis had left the Union to become President of the Confederate States of America. There was resentment among some members of Congress about the inscription of Davis' name on the bridge, and this led to an order that his name be removed from the tablet. The Department of the Interior, which was managing the aqueduct at that time, ordered the removal of the inscription.

In 1908, President Theodore Roosevelt was asked by various constituents to restore Davis' name to the tablet. Roosevelt ordered the restoration.

=== Twentieth century naming confusion ===
Some additional confusion over the bridge name arose when the Capital Beltway was constructed in the early 1960s, and the nearby Beltway bridge over the Potomac River was also called the "Cabin John Bridge." However, in 1969 the Beltway bridge was formally named the "American Legion Memorial Bridge."

== Historic designations ==
The Union Arch Bridge was designated as a National Historic Civil Engineering Landmark by the American Society of Civil Engineers in 1972 and was listed in the National Register of Historic Places in 1973. Both designations refer to the bridge as the "Cabin John Aqueduct."

== Current operation ==
The bridge continues to support the Washington Aqueduct, as well as a roadway, MacArthur Boulevard. Traffic is narrowed to one lane with traffic signals controlling traffic in either direction. A concrete barrier along the south side creates a separated pedestrian walkway across the bridge. Metal fencing on both sides prevents pedestrians and objects from falling and cyclists from riding on the parapet. Signs remind road maintenance crews not to salt the roadway in winter months.

The U.S. Army Corps of Engineers completed a renovation of the bridge in 2001.

== See also ==
- Washington Aqueduct
- List of bridges documented by the Historic American Engineering Record in Maryland
- List of bridges on the National Register of Historic Places in Maryland
