= Cabin John Creek =

Tributary stream of the Potomac River in Montgomery County, Maryland, United States

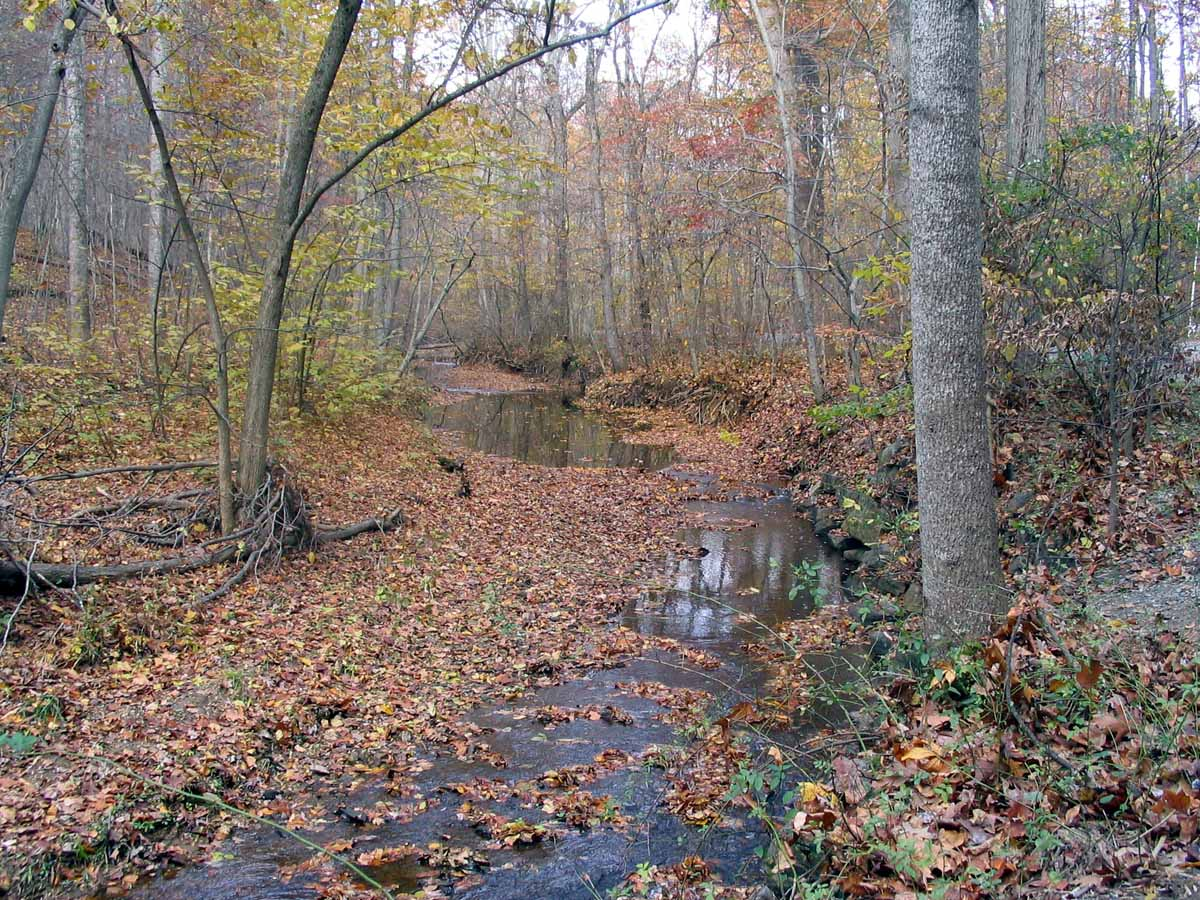
- Cabin John Creek near Rockville, Maryland

- Mouth of Cabin John Creek

Location
- Country: United States
- State: Maryland
- County: Montgomery County

Physical characteristics
- Source
  - location: Rockville
  - coordinates: 39.0759418°N 77.1533132°W
- Mouth: Potomac River
  - location: Glen Echo
  - coordinates: 38.969833°N 77.146368°W
  - elevation: 56 ft (17 m)
- Length: 10.9 mi (17.5 km)
- Basin size: 26 sq mi (67 km^{2})

Basin features
- River system: Potomac River

Cabin John Creek is a tributary stream of the Potomac River in Montgomery County, Maryland. The watershed covers an area of 26 square miles (67 km^{2}). The headwaters of the creek originate in the city of Rockville, and the creek flows southward for 10.9 miles (17.5 km) to the Potomac River.

== History ==
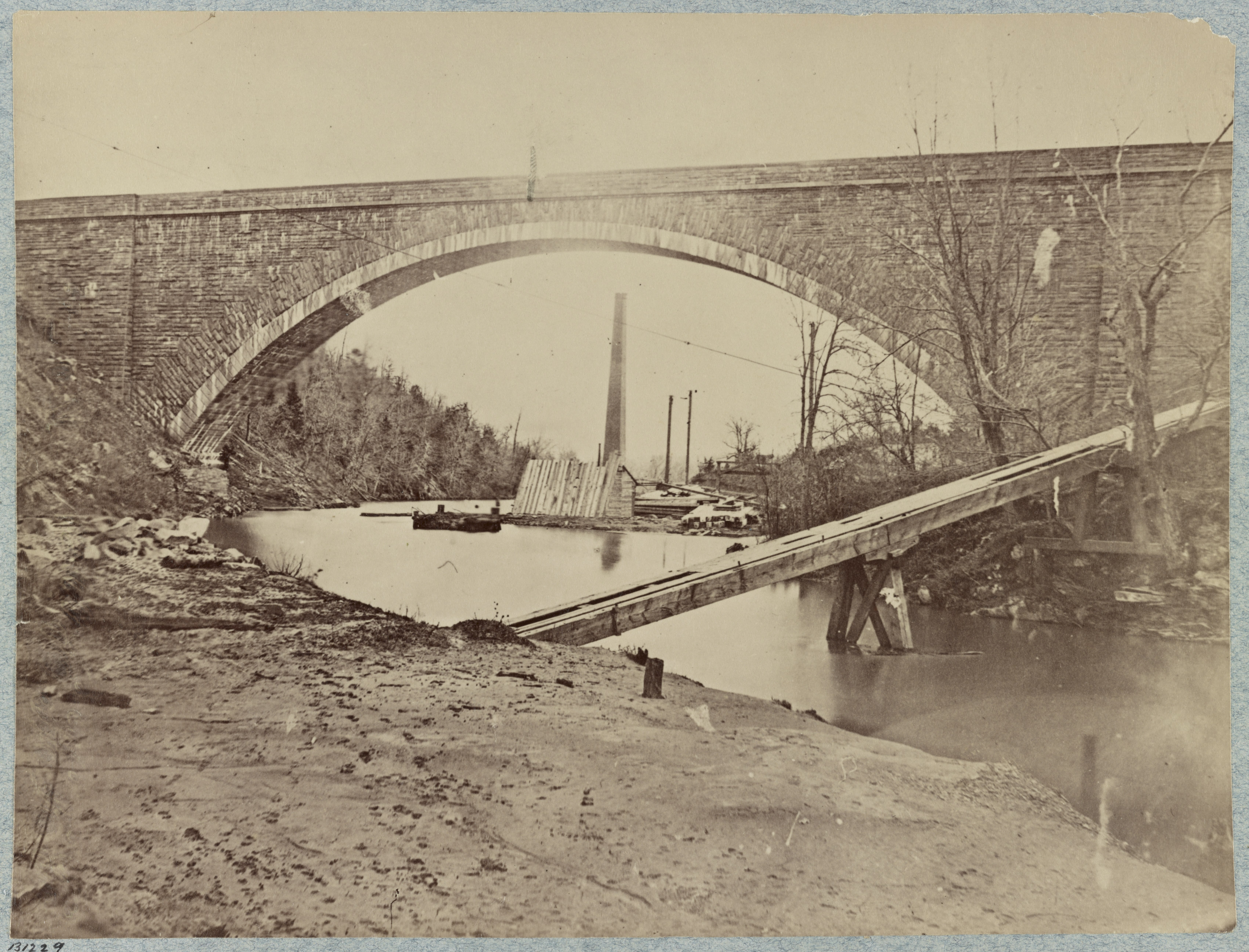
Union Arch Bridge (Cabin John Bridge) in the 1880s

Early land records in 1715 cite Captain John's Run, now Cabin John Creek. The toponym "Cabin John" is thought to be a corruption of the name "Captain John", but the origin of the name remains unresolved.

== Course ==
The headwaters of the creek originate in the city of Rockville. The Cabin John Stream Valley Trail follows the course of the creek for 8.8 miles (14.2 km), passing through Cabin John Regional Park and Cabin John Local Park. The Union Arch Bridge carries MacArthur Boulevard and the Washington Aqueduct over the stream about 1/4 mile before the creek flows through a culvert under the Chesapeake and Ohio Canal and empties into the Potomac River near Cabin John, Maryland.

== Water pollution ==
The Cabin John Creek watershed is highly developed, and as a result the water quality in the creek main stem and several tributaries is degraded. Montgomery County Government is implementing a long-term plan to improve water quality throughout the area, including stormwater management and stream restoration projects. As of 2021 the county has installed restoration projects on the Booze Creek and Buck Branch tributaries.

== Tributaries of Cabin John Creek ==
Listed from south to north:

- Booze Creek
- Thomas Branch (also called Beltway Branch and Thomas Run)
- Ken Branch
- Buck Branch
- Congressional Branch
- Snakeden Branch (also called Snake Den Branch)
- Old Farm Creek
- Bogley Branch

== See also ==
- Cabin John Parkway
- List of Maryland rivers
