= Belmont (Chevy Chase, Maryland) =

Undeveloped neighborhood for African Americans in Chevy Chase, Maryland, U.S.

- Undeveloped subdivision
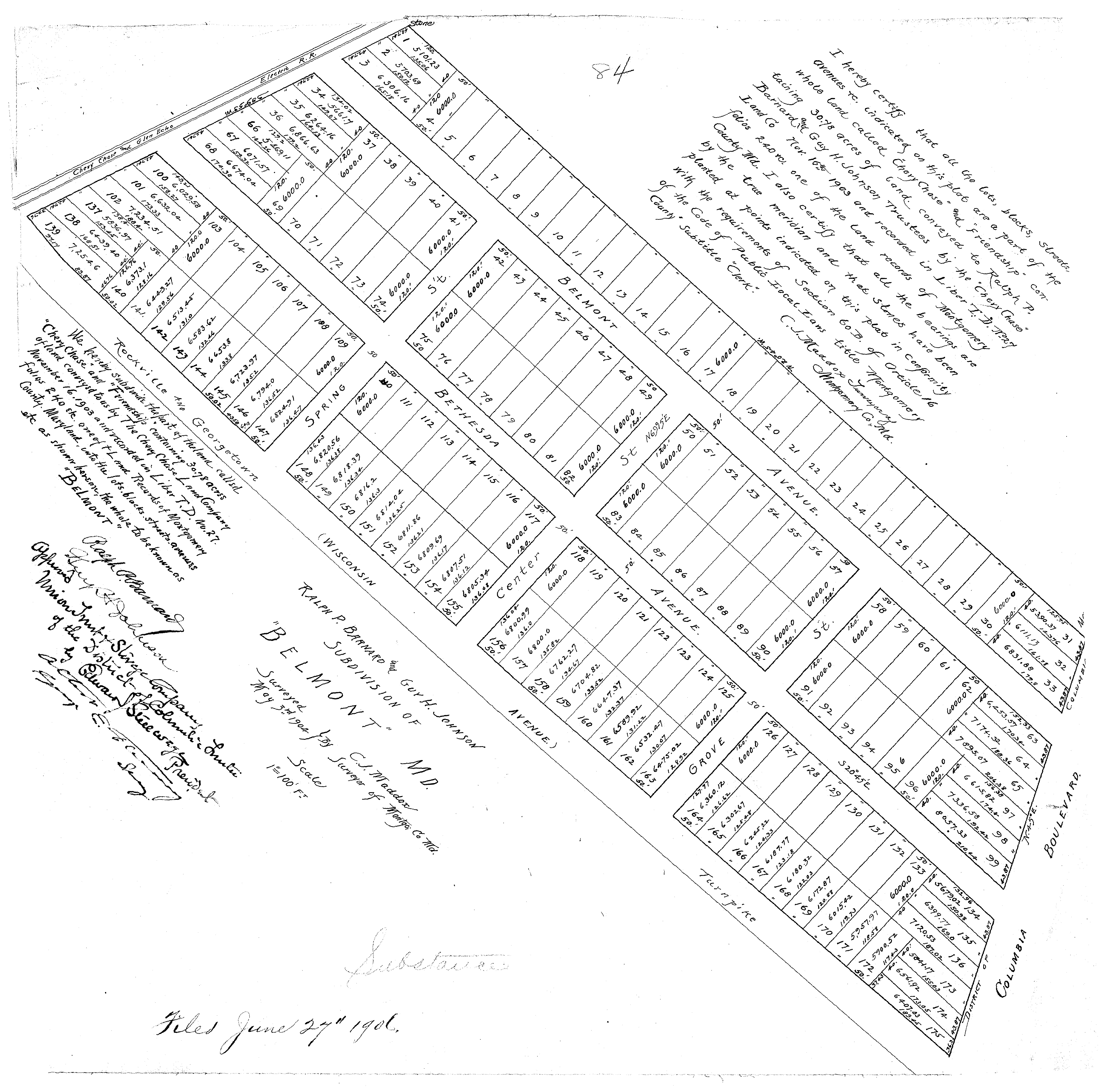
- Recorded plat of Belmont.

- Belmont in Maryland Belmont (the United States)
- Coordinates: 38°57′43″N 77°05′10″W
- Country: United States
- State: Maryland
- County: Montgomery
- Subdivision: 1906
- Extinguished: 1926

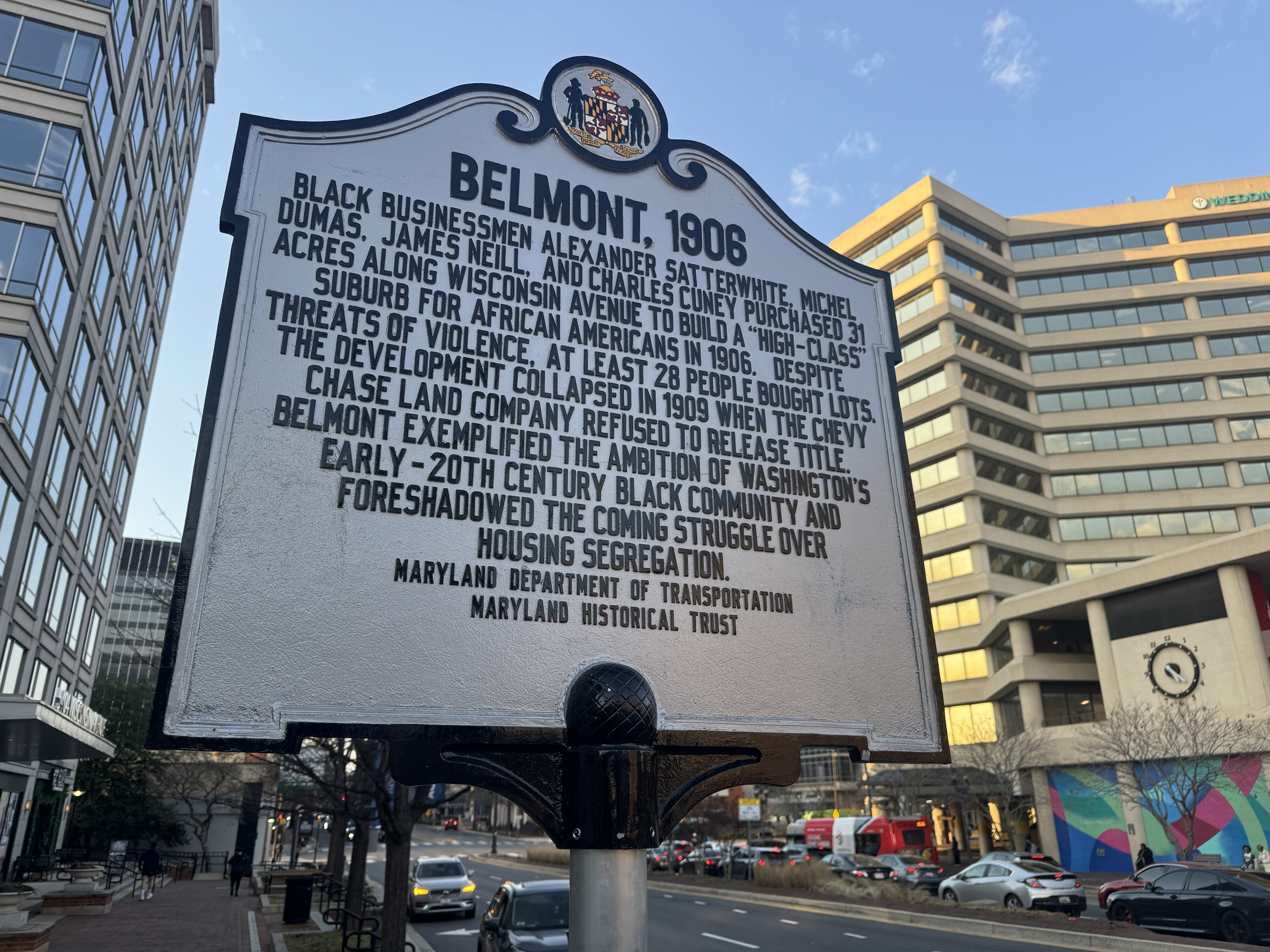
A 2024 historical marker commemorates the attempt to establish Belmont and its thwarting by the Chevy Chase Land Company. The sign stands in Friendship Heights Village, across the street from the actual Belmont parcel. Visible at right is the 2 Wisconsin Place office building, built on the parcel and still owned by the company.

The Belmont property was a subdivided strip of land at the southwestern tip of Chevy Chase, Maryland, along Wisconsin Avenue. In 1906, a group of African American investors acquired the 31-acre parcel and sold lots to other African Americans in an effort to develop a high-end suburb for D.C.'s growing Black middle class. Had the project succeeded, it would have been one of the earliest modern suburbs developed for African Americans.

The scheme met hostility from white residents of nearby Friendship Heights, Somerset, and Drummond. Ultimately, the landowner that had assembled the parcel, the Chevy Chase Land Company, was able to prevent the African American group from conveying the land to their purchasers, triggering their financial collapse and foreclosure in 1909.

In 1926, Land Company executives had the subdivision extinguished from the property books of Montgomery County, Maryland. They incorporated part of the land into Chevy Chase Section 1A—today's Chevy Chase Village—while the portion immediately abutting Wisconsin Avenue was redeveloped decades later for various commercial uses.

== History ==
The Belmont property was assembled by the Chevy Chase Land Company, which had been founded in 1890 by Francis G. Newlands to develop all-white residential suburbs. The parcel was bounded on the west by Wisconsin Avenue, on the southeast by Columbia Avenue (today's Western Avenue), and on the north by the Chevy Chase Circle extension of the Washington and Glen Echo Railroad.

In 1903, the company sold the parcel to Ralph P. Barnard and Guy H. Johnson, Washington lawyers who served as trustees for a syndicate consisting of themselves and two bankers, R. Golden Donaldson and Frank P. Reeside. The group entered into a deed of trust with the Union Trust Bank to secure a loan from the Land Company. On November 14, 1904, they paid off their debt, and in return, Union Trust released 20 Belmont lots to Reeside in trust for Barnard, Johnson, and Donaldson. In 1906, Barnard and Johnson hired Harry M. Martin to market lots.

But just months later, they sold the entire property on June 23, 1906, to William J. Sheetz, a white mechanical engineer who was acting as a straw buyer for a group of four Black investors: Alexander L. Satterwhite, James L. Neill, Michel O. Dumas, and Charles S. Cuney. Satterwhite and Dumas immediately bought the land on behalf of the Belmont Syndicate, the four investors' trust agreement to purchase and share the profits of Belmont.

On July 1, 1906, an advertisement for the Belmont property appeared in The Washington Post. "Colored People Attention", it said, inviting African Americans to invest in "an ideal suburban lot in the most beautiful and most rapidly improving section of Northwest Washington, Belmont Chevy Chase." The ad proclaimed Belmont "the only good subdivision in Washington where colored people are welcomed to buy."

At least 28 African Americans bought lots, including a Civil War veteran, a Methodist preacher, members of Washington, D.C.'s Black elite society, and several single women.

Within days, the surrounding area's white neighbors rose in opposition. On July 5, The Washington Times reported that residents of Friendship Heights, Drummond, Somerset, and Bethesda were taking up arms to stop the sale of plots to Black people. The following day, The New York Times wrote that the Belmont owners had given options on some lots to Black purchasers, which "has awakened the white property owners to the danger that menaces them in having a negro colony touching elbows with them and sharing the pretty suburban trolley that runs out along the crest of the Heights from Chevy Chase to Rockville." Richard M. Ough, a builder in Friendship Heights, said that "no negro shall ever build a house in Belmont….White men certainly cannot be expected to endure it—and we shall not endure it." Ough said he and others would organize in violent protest, though no such protest is known to have occurred.

This was the first of many times that the Belmont Syndicate would face opposition.

On Sunday, July 15, Satterwhite was arrested by the town marshal of Somerset for selling real estate without a license, which carried a fine of up to $30,000. Six days later, Satterwhite appeared before James Loughborough, a local justice of the peace. Satterwhite was acquitted with the help of his attorney, Thomas Dawson, who argued that because Satterwhite owned the Belmont property, he was well within his right to sell it without a license.

Almost immediately, Satterwhite was arrested for a second time by the marshal, this time for selling land on a Sunday. He was once again acquitted by Judge Loughborough.

Legal challenges eventually forced the Syndicate to sell the Belmont property. In the April 17, 1907, edition of The Evening Star, Dr. Zeno B. Babbitt announced that he had made an agreement to buy Belmont. Within a month, and without telling the other members of the Syndicate, Satterwhite sold his shares in the Belmont lands to Ewell J. Nevitt and entered into a trust agreement with Babbitt.

Meanwhile, Dumas and his lawyer collected all the necessary items to release lots under the Second Deed of Trust, one of which was a deed of release to be signed by Reeside and Donaldson. Barnard, Johnson, Reeside, and Donaldson refused to release the lot from their possession. Due to the terms of purchase, other parties such as the Chevy Chase Land Company and the Union Trust Bank were allowed to deny the land's release.

On June 20, 1907, Dumas filed a lawsuit naming all of the people and corporations engaged in the Belmont land transactions up until 1907 as defendants. The suit and subsequent suits for the next decade proved to be unfruitful, ending in a stalemate over 20 lots. The four men then went their separate ways and the Belmont Syndicate was dissolved.

Twenty years later, the Chevy Chase Land Company petitioned the court to erase a subdivision called Belmont from the Montgomery County property books, following a settlement with a Howard University trustee named Michel O. Dumas."

== Later use ==
By 1942, a Howard Johnson's motel occupied the southern tip of the property, at the intersection of Western and Wisconsin.

Some of the Belmont parcel is occupied by houses in Chevy Chase Village. The stretch along Wisconsin Avenue is occupied, in part, by a Saks Fifth Avenue, the 2 Wisconsin Circle office building, and a shopping center called The Collection at Chevy Chase.

A historic marker commemorating Belmont was put up in September 2024. It stands on the western side of Wisconsin Avenue just north of Western Avenue—near, but not on, the Belmont parcel. Asked about the marker, Chevy Chase Land Company CEO John Ziegenhein said that today's company believes "in the importance of transparency regarding the actions taken at Belmont. More importantly, we must ensure those actions are never repeated."

== See also ==
Early African American suburbs:

- Deanwood, Washington, D.C.
- Glenarden, Maryland, founded c. 1911
- Fairmount Heights, Maryland
- Lincoln, Maryland, founded 1908.
- Morgan Park, Baltimore
- Wilson Park, Baltimore
- Frederick Douglass Court, developed by Maggie L. Walker in Richmond, Virginia.
