= Washington Railway and Electric Company =

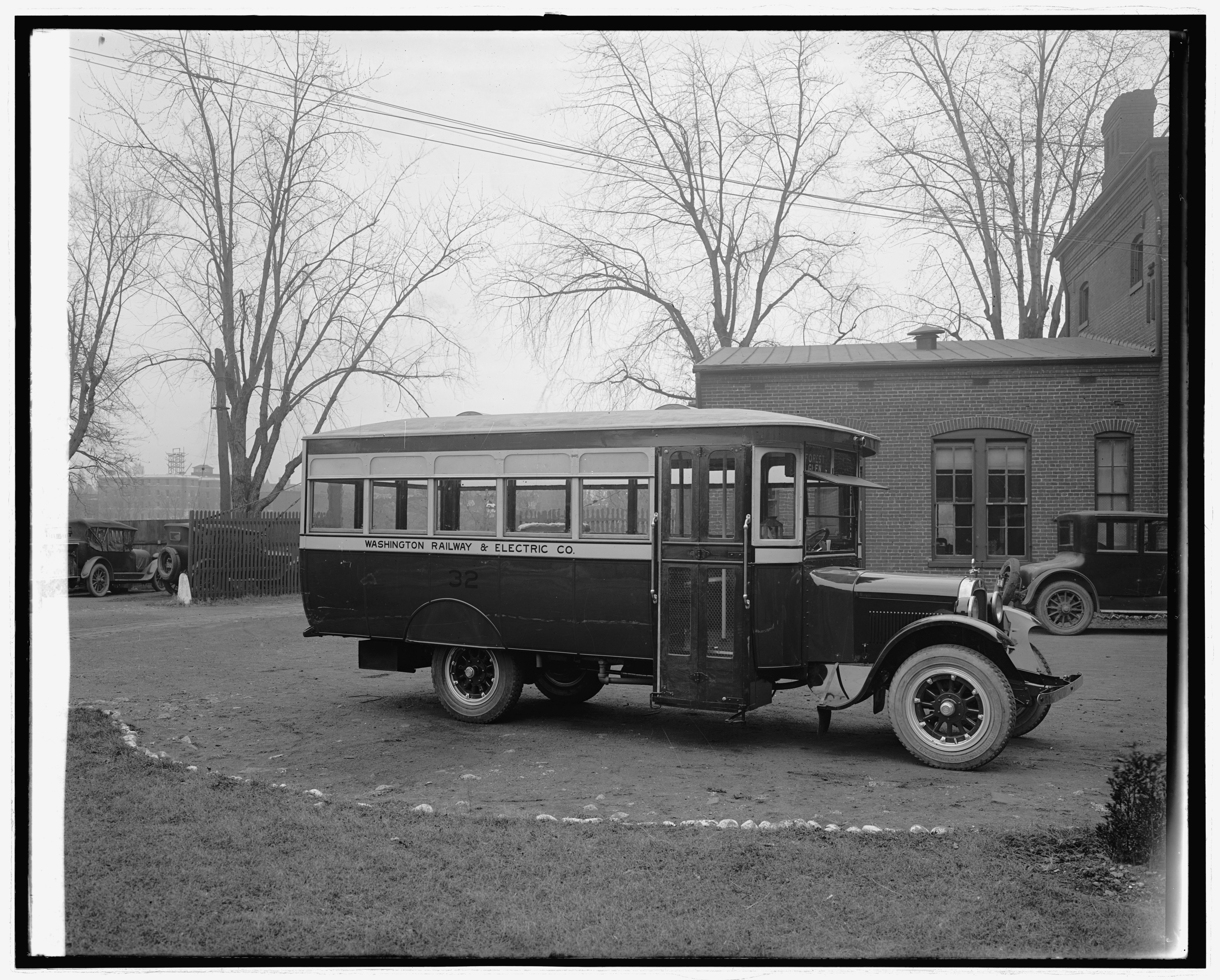
- Bus, between 1910 and 1926

Overview
- Headquarters: Washington, D.C.
- Locale: Washington, D.C., and its Maryland suburbs
- Dates of operation: August 29, 1892; 134 years ago–December 1, 1933
- Predecessor: Washington and Great Falls Electric Railway Company
- Successor: Capital Transit Company

Technical
- Length: 60.19 miles (96.87 km) (1918)

The Washington Railway and Electric Company (WREC) was the larger of the two major streetcar companies in Washington, D.C., and its Maryland suburbs in the early decades of the 20th century.

Founded as the Washington and Great Falls Electric Railway Company in 1892, the company was appointed by act of Congress in 1900 to acquire several other streetcar companies that had been swept into a failed conglomerate. Consequent acquisitions transformed the company into the region's largest transit operator. Renamed Washington Railway and Electric Company in 1902, it controlled lines from Anacostia in Southeast D.C. past the White House and out to various Maryland cities and towns, including Rockville and Cabin John to the northwest and Hyattsville and Laurel to the northeast.

The WREC operated until 1933, when it was merged with its main competitor, the Capital Traction Company, to form the Capital Transit Company.

== History ==
=== First decade ===
By 1890, efforts were underway to win a congressional charter to build a streetcar line from the Georgetown neighborhood of Washington, D.C., to Cabin John Creek in Maryland's Montgomery County. On June 14, 1892, the House of Representatives authorized the charter in a series of votes that also forbade the use of horsecars in the District of Columbia after year's end. On July 29, 1892, the Washington and Great Falls Electric Railway Company received its charter. Among its reported provisions: the railroad's right-of-way would not be taxed as real estate, but the company was required to light the streets it ran along and to pay four percent of gross revenue.

The route would run from a passenger station to be constructed in the block bounded by 35th and 36th Streets and M and Prospect Streets NW, just north of the Aqueduct Bridge in Georgetown, "running thence west over the [Chesapeake and Ohio] Canal road on an elevated railway of iron columns and beams", along the southern side of the Georgetown Reservoir, through the just-conceived neighborhood of The Palisades, and past Chain Bridge. Crossing into Maryland, it would turn northward toward Glen Echo and Cabin John. The northern terminus was chosen for the "weekend and summer resort for wealthy and well-known Washingtonians" that had grown up around the Washington Aqueduct's Union Arch Bridge since the 1870s.

Construction began on a single-track line in 1893, including the erection of a 280-foot steel Pratt truss bridge to cross the Foundry Branch stream in Georgetown. The company was authorized to use purchases and eminent domain to acquire the necessary rights-of-way; it would obtain the final parcel in this manner in August 1895.

In May 1895, the company asked D.C. courts to approve an increase in the company's stock to $650,000 ($25,160,000 today). The appeal noted that its charter limited its stock to covering construction expenses, and noted some of them: "Grading, $111,666; track, $76,361; line, $27,530; equipment, $169,906; power, $52,750; general expenses, $149,359. Two of the principal items of expense are as follows: Bridges, $50,640; 1,235 tons of rails, $38,550; motor cars are estimated at $1,800 each; trail cars, $1,500 each; 50-horse power motor equipments, $1,100 each."

Tracks reached the Maryland line on September 28, 1895. Operations began shortly thereafter, with speeds limited to five miles per hour while running on roads and crossings, and fares capped at 10 cents a ride. (An amendment of June 3, 1896, would allow the construction of a branch "to a point on the Georgetown and Tenallytown Railway at or near the junction of the Loughboro road with the River road".) The president of the line at the time was Stilson Hutchins, who was also the publisher of the first Washington Times newspaper.

Tracks reached Cabin John in 1897. "When the line was finished, it was recognized for the scenic views along its route which traveled through neighborhoods and wooded areas interspersed with vistas over the Potomac River. It was also the only streetcar line in the District known to have followed a private right of way for an extensive portion of its route rather than an already established street or road," a 2019 history would report.

The line's success led the railroad to double-track the route by 1899 and replace seven wooden trestles with steel structures. Rolling stock was housed in the Falls Car Barn, a one-story, six-track wood-frame building completed in 1896 (demolished in 1946) at the line's Georgetown terminus at 38th and Prospect Streets NW.

==== West Washington and Great Falls Electric Railway Company ====
On November 1, 1895, a new streetcar company—somewhat confusingly named the West Washington and Great Falls Electric Railway Company—was founded to connect Glen Echo to the new development of Chevy Chase, Maryland. Its line ran from a junction with the Tennallytown and Rockville Railroad at today's Wisconsin Avenue, then westward to Glen Echo, largely along the route of today's Bradley Boulevard. It was acquired by the Washington and Great Falls Electric Railway Company on July 1, 1896.

=== The Great Streetcar Consolidation ===
The decade that followed the stock market crash of 1893 saw the consolidation of nearly all of the D.C. and suburban Maryland streetcar companies into two larger corporations. The first of these was the Capital Traction Company, formed by the 1895 merger of the Rock Creek Railway and the Washington and Georgetown Railroad Company. The second began to take shape from 1896 to 1899, when a consortium of three businessmen purchased controlling interests in a half dozen streetcar companies and a pair of utility companies, and swept them into a holding company named the Washington Traction and Electric Company. But the consortium had borrowed too heavily and paid too much, and so quickly fell into financial trouble. To prevent transit disruption, Congress on June 5, 1900, authorized the Washington and Great Falls to acquire the stock of any of the railways and power companies owned by Washington Traction. After the latter defaulted on its loans on June 1, 1901, the former moved in to take its place.

On February 1, 1902, Washington and Great Falls changed its name to the Washington Railway and Electric Company (WREC, sometimes WRECO) and reincorporated as a holding company. Three days later, it exchanged its stock for shares in Washington Traction, one-for-one at a discounted rate. The company financed the deal by issuing $17.5 million in bonds ($651,200,000 today) and $15 million in stock.

The WREC thereby absorbed:

- Metropolitan Railroad
- Columbia Railway

It also took control of all of Washington Traction's stock in (and debt owed by) several other companies:

- City and Suburban Railway
- Brightwood Railway
- Anacostia and Potomac River Railroad
- Georgetown and Tennallytown Railway
- Washington Woodside and Forest Glen Railway
- Washington and Glen Echo Railroad
- Washington and Rockville Railway Company

It would soon take control of Potomac Electric Power Company, whose power plant in D.C. would drive the system's streetcars, and United States Electric Lighting Company.

Not every company became a part of the WREC immediately. The City and Suburban Railway and the Georgetown and Tennallytown Railroad operated as subsidiaries until October 31, 1926, when the WREC purchased the remainder of their stock.

But the 1902 transaction turned the WREC into the region's largest transit company, with some 60 miles of track stretching from V Street SE in Anacostia, up Pennsylvania Avenue and throughout downtown D.C.; out to Bethesda, Rockville, and Silver Spring in Maryland; and to Glen Echo and Great Falls along the Potomac.

WREC would compete with the Capital Traction Company for the next three decades.

=== Operations ===
In 1909, the car barn at Wisconsin and Calvert was replaced by the Tenallytown Barn at 5230 Wisconsin Avenue. "The coal was delivered to the new barn in small single truck hoppers via the streetcar line, which was a tremendous feat given the steep grade from the river through Georgetown to Calvert Street," a 2006 history would report.

For nearly a decade after the expansion, WREC charged passengers a single five-cent ticket (six tickets could be had for 25 cents) to ride anywhere in the system. But in 1910, WREC and its subsidiary lines, the Georgetown and Tennallytown and Washington and Rockville, began requiring an additional five-cent ticket for rides that crossed the District-Maryland boundary. Citizens of the D.C. neighborhood of Friendship Heights and of the Montgomery County municipalities of Drummond and Somerset complained to the Interstate Commerce Commission, arguing that the hike was unjust and unreasonable under ICC rules. WREC responded that streetcar companies were exempt from rules governing railroads. In 1912, the ICC rejected this argument and ordered a stop to the practice.

At the time, WREC owned all of the stock of the Washington and Rockville Company and about three-quarters of the Georgetown and Tenallytown Company.

Washingtonians used the line to reach the 76-acre International Athletic Park, a sporting field, velodrome, and amusement park on the site of Washington's present-day Sibley Hospital.

In 1911, the WREC built a trolley park, an amusement park near the end of a line to spur ridership—a practice pioneered by other streetcar companies, including several in the Washington, D.C., area. This was Glen Echo Amusement Park, constructed on the site of an earlier Chautauqua assembly that closed in 1903. The park would remain a fixture of Washington life until closing in the late 1960s; reopened in the 1970s by the National Park Service, the park is listed on the National Register of Historic Places and now operates as an arts and cultural center.

In 1917, the WREC was running about 140 cars a day, about 20 more than its Capital Traction rival. The following year, the system operated 60.19 miles of track, more than double the length of the Capital Traction system. Overhead electrical wires powered 26.77 miles of double track and 3.99 miles of single track, while underground systems powered 23.09 miles of double track and 6.34 miles of single track. It shared 1.55 miles of underground-powered double track with Capital Traction, and 0.7 miles with the Washington and Virginia Company.

But far more often, portions of the WREC system competed with Capital Traction on slightly different routes. For example, the main route of the Metropolitan Railroad roughly paralleled that of the Washington and Georgetown Railroad, which ran largely along Pennsylvania Avenue, one of the major diagonal streets in downtown Washington. But the Metropolitan's route was longer, since it had to zigzag on north–south and east–west streets.

From 1913 to 1921, WREC was paid to operate yet another similarly named streetcar company connecting Wisconsin Avenue with a Potomac River community: the Washington and Great Falls Railway and Power Company. The only streetcar line to actually reach Great Falls, the WGFPC was a project of developers unconnected to the WREC. They sought merely to increase the value of their land and incipient residential development, and were uninterested in operating a streetcar as a business. So they paid the WREC—specifically, its Washington and Rockville Railway subsidiary—to furnish, operate, and power the rolling stock. Tracklaying began in mid-1912 and the line opened in 1913. It was generally operated as a stub, and often with just a single trolley shuttling back and forth. "However, for at least a while, a through service was operated to downtown Washington, with cars from Great Falls running all the way to 8th Street," the National Capital Trolley Museum wrote in 2012. Some passengers rode to the Great Falls Hotel. The railroad ceased operations in 1921.

WREC began to switch to buses. In 1930, it built Washington, D.C.'s first purpose-built garage for servicing and storing transit buses at 2112 Georgia Avenue.

=== New ownership ===
North American Company began to acquire stock in WREC in 1922, gaining a controlling interest by 1928. North American had once been one of the original stocks in the Dow Jones Industrial Average.

On December 1, 1933, WREC, Capital Traction, and the Washington Rapid Transit bus company merged to form the Capital Transit Company. WREC continued as a holding company, owning half of Capital Transit stock and all of PEPCO's, while Capital Traction was dissolved.

By December 31, 1933, North American Company owned 50.016% of the voting stock of WREC. North American also tried to purchase Capital Traction, but never owned more than 2.5% of Capital Traction stock. But for the first time street railways in Washington were under the management of one company.

Capital Transit made several changes. As part of the merger, the Capital Traction generating plant in Georgetown was closed (and in 1943 decommissioned) and Capital Transit used only conventionally supplied electric power. In 1935 it closed several lines and replaced them with bus service. Because the Rockville line in Maryland was one of the lines that was closed, a new terminal, the "Capital Transit Community Terminal," opened at Wisconsin Avenue NW and Western Avenue NW on August 4, 1935.

WREC remained under the ownership of North American Company for the next decade, as a major subsidiary holding company of other lines.

By 1940, North American had become a US$2.3 billion holding company heading up a pyramid of by then 80 companies. It controlled ten major direct subsidiaries in eight of which it owned at least 79%. By then WREC was one of the three major holding companies among the ten direct subsidiaries.

North American Company was broken up by the Securities and Exchange Commission, following the United States Supreme Court decision of April 1, 1946.

== Legacy ==
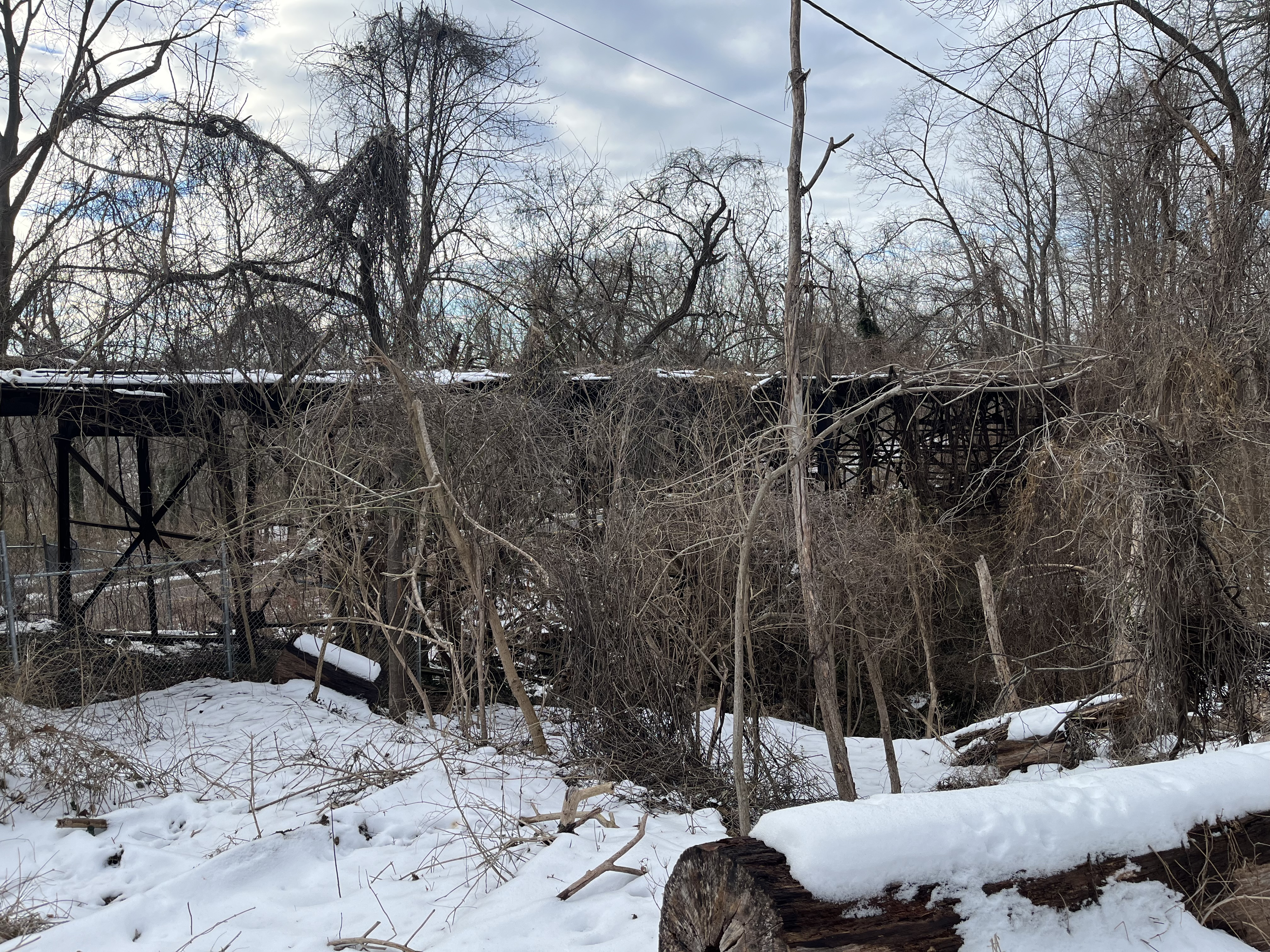
The Wilson Lane Trestle (Bridge #10), built in 1896 by the old Washington and Great Falls Electric Railway, stands in Cabin John Stream Valley Park in Glen Echo.

Much of the right-of-way from Brookmont to Cabin John Parkway still exists, including the turnaround Loop near the Union Arch Trail, though the rail was removed shortly after abandonment. Ownership is divided between WMATA, NPS, the Army Corps of Engineers, and the Town of Glen Echo. In the years since the streetcars stopped running, the right-of-way has been used as an easement for power, water and communication lines; as part of the Clara Barton Parkway and part of the MacArthur Boulevard Bikeway. It has been considered as a route for a monorail to Dulles Airport, a widened Parkway, a modern trolley, and a bike trail.

In 1957, the Park Service condemned a portion of the right-of-way—west of the creek on the west side of Glen Echo that runs parallel to Wilson Lane—to obtain land for the George Washington Memorial Parkway, today's Clara Barton Parkway. The streetcar was allowed to run on this land, which included part of the trestle over the creek, until it ceased operations in 1960. The Park Service also made plans to move a quarter-mile section of the streetcar line, north from Dalecarlia Reservoir, up the hill to make room for the Parkway. The streetcar quit running before the move was needed and in 1964, after years of negotiation, D.C. Transit agreed to let NPS use part of the right-of-way for the Parkway while they negotiated the purchase, but NPS never bought the land.

Bridge #7 over the Little Falls Branch Valley was removed in the 1960s.

In 1966, the Corps of Engineers condemned a small strip of the right-of-way west of the Washington Aqueduct near the Dalecarlia water treatment plant, leveled it with fill dirt from the Washington Metro expansion, and, in the early 1970s, erected buildings on it.

In 1992, D.C. Transit defaulted on its payments to the Riders' Fund, which was created in 1990 to settle two cases that challenged the company's fare increases of the 1960s and 1970s. The Fund foreclosed on D.C. Transit's collateral, which included the Cabin John right-of-way, and the Riders’ Fund bought it—minus the trestles—at a public foreclosure sale on June 16, 1993. In 1995, the Fund revoked the permission it had granted NPS to use their right-of-way for the Parkway; when NPS continued to use it, the Fund sued the agency, alleging an illegal taking. In 1997, the right-of-way—including the trestles—was transferred, along with other assets, to WMATA, which continued the suit against NPS. In 2002, WMATA won and received compensation for the land.

In 2000, the Town of Glen Echo bought the portion of the right-of way that ran through the town, concluding a nearly 40-year effort long thwarted by ownership changes and a land dispute between NPS and WMATA.

In 2007, WMATA traded right-of-way next to Glen Echo Park, from Oxford Avenue to Tulane Avenue including Bridge #9, to NPS for a plot of land near WMATA's water-treatment facility near Mississippi Avenue SE in Washington, D.C. In 2014, NPS rehabilitated Bridge #9, the trestle over Minnehaha Branch on the northwest side of Glen Echo Park, and rerouted the MacArthur Boulevard Bike Path over it.

In 2018-23, NPS reviewed a Special Park Use permit request from the Washington Metropolitan Area Transit Authority (WMATA) to demolish Bridge #8, the trestle over Walhonding Brook between MacArthur Boulevard and Clara Barton Parkway; and Bridge #10, the Wilson Lane Trolley Bridge over an unnamed riverine sometimes called Bannockburn Creek or Braeburn Branch just west of Wellesley Circle. Bridges 8 and 10 are the last two remaining trolley bridges on the line in Maryland.

The Washington Railway and Electric Company (WRECO) bus garage at 2112 Georgia Avenue was built by WRECO in 1930. It was transferred with the other assets to Capital Transit in 1933 and then to D.C. Transit in 1955. In 1972, WMATA chose not to buy it from D.C. Transit as part of their take-over of transit operations in DC. It eventually came into the ownership of Howard University and sits vacant, though there are plans to redevelop it.

== See also ==
- Streetcars in Washington, D.C.
- Streetcars in Washington, D.C., and Maryland
