= Georgetown-to-Rockville streetcar service =

Washington Railway and Electric Company (Georgetown-Rockville service)

Overview
- Other names: Georgetown and Tennallytown Railway, Washington and Rockville Electric Railway
- Status: defunct
- Termini: Georgetown, Washington, D.C.; Rockville, Maryland

Service
- Type: Streetcar

A trio of streetcar companies provided service along a single 10-mile line from the Washington, D.C., neighborhood of Georgetown northward and ultimately to Rockville, Maryland, from 1890 to the early decades of the 20th century.

In 1890, the Georgetown and Tennallytown Railway, or G&T, began operating electric streetcars from Georgetown to the D.C. village of Tenleytown, and later through today's D.C. neighborhood of Friendship Heights to just over the Maryland state line. Several years later, the Tennallytown and Rockville Railway, or T&R, opened service from the G&T's northern terminus to the community of Bethesda, Maryland. Finally, the Washington and Rockville Electric Railway, or W&R, was incorporated in 1897 to extend the line to Rockville.

Controlling interest in the companies was obtained in the late 1890s by the Washington Traction and Electric Company, then in 1902 by the Washington Railway and Electric Company. The WRECo operated until 1933, when it was merged with its main competitor, the Capital Traction Company, to form the Capital Transit Company, which replaced streetcar service by buses in 1935.

== History ==
=== Georgetown and Tennallytown Railway ===
Chartered on August 22, 1888, the G&T was the third streetcar company to incorporate in the nation's capital city. Capitalized with $200,000 in $50 shares, it actually cost $211,000 to build the line, including tracks, powerhouse, machinery, and nine cars. The G&T began operations in April 1890 on a route that ran north from M Street NW up 32nd Street NW and then onto the Georgetown and Rockville Road (now Wisconsin Avenue NW) through the extant village of Tenleytown. Ultimately, it ran through the D.C. neighborhood of Friendship Heights and terminated just over the Maryland state border at Wisconsin and Willard Avenues.

Its backers included local land developers John W. Thompson, Richard H. Goldsborough, John E. Beall, William King Ryan, and Osceola C. Green. In its first eight months of operation, it took in $3,100 more than operating expenses. In 1891, it reported profits of $10,000 on $40,000 in revenue and 800,000 passengers carries. But by August 1893, the line was more than $60,000 in debt.

The original G&T power house and car barn (built 1890, burned 1914) sat on the east side of Wisconsin Avenue at Calvert Street NW, on a lot about one-and-a-half-stories below street grade. The second story of the wood-frame building held a transfer table and three tracks that emerged from the north elevation of the barn. A steam power plant and water reservoir sat at the back of the lot. The power plant burned Cumberland coal, shipped to Georgetown via the Chesapeake & Ohio Canal.

In 1899, residents of Georgetown would protest the railroad's plan to haul freight as well as passengers.

=== Tennallytown and Rockville Railway ===
Shortly before the G&T began operations in 1890, one of its officers—lawyer and real estate broker Beall—gathered three other railway incorporators and seven fellow investors in Bethesda land and incorporated the Tennallytown and Rockville Railway to continue the streetcar's northern push. Beall, who owned or co-owned some 1,000 acres of land along the future streetcar tracks, anointed himself president of the new line. He also purchased controlling interest in the Georgetown and Rockville Turnpike Company to ease the right-of-way negotiations.

In 1890, the T&R received its charter and began building tracks from the G&T's northern terminus at Wisconsin and Willard Avenues. It had no powerhouse, car barn, or rolling stock, all of which were provided by the G&T. Four streetcars—one enclosed, three open—ran under overhead power lines. The fare was six tickets for 25 cents; trolleys departed every 15 minutes.

T&R trolleys began operations on July 4, 1891, running on 3.75 miles of track. The route went up Wisconsin, then left on Old Georgetown Road, the better to avoid the hills of the Georgetown and Rockville Turnpike. The single-track line had two passing sidings: the first where the line left Rockville Pike for Old Georgetown Road and the second about two miles further on, just south of Alta Vista. The line terminated at Bethesda Park, an amusement park built by the railroad on 50.25 acres on the west side of Old Georgetown Road between the modern-day streets of Cedar and Greentree Road. Opened along with the streetcar service in 1891, the park operated until it was destroyed by an 1896 hurricane. The T&R itself would not fulfill an 1889 promise to extend its tracks to Rockville.

The T&R's southern terminal at Wisconsin and Willard was also a connection point to the Glen Echo Railroad (later renamed the Washington and Glen Echo Railroad). Starting on July 10, 1891, the Glen Echo provided service due west to the intersection of Conduit (today's Macarthur Boulevard) and Walhonding Roads. By August, a station named "The Junction" was serving passengers transferring between the G&T, T&R, and Glen Echo lines. In 1896, the Glen Echo line would be extended northwest to Glen Echo and Cabin John and from the Wisconsin terminal northeast to Chevy Chase Circle, where it connected with the Rock Creek Railway line of the Capital Traction Company. A new line was later built from the Circle through the town of Somerset to the Conduit-Walhonding station, resulting in a new crossing of the T&R about a quarter-mile north of the Wisconsin-Willard terminal.

In early 1893, the T&R double-tracked its line and, building on the close corporate ties with the G&T, began operating through service between Georgetown and Bethesda Park.

Beall built the T&R on debt: a $25,000 mortgage in 1892, an additional $100,000 in 1893, the first year of a national depression. By 1893, when he owned 94 percent of the stock, he had mortgaged all of his own property holdings. In May 1896, the T&R was sold at foreclosure for $36,500. The following year, a Washington guidebook said that only "occasional cars run northward as far as Bethesda".

=== Washington and Rockville Electric Railway ===
On September 9, 1897, the Washington and Rockville Electric Railway was incorporated to extend the line from the northern terminus of the T&R onward to Bethesda and Rockville. Power was supplied by the Potomac Electric Power Company plant in the District of Columbia. The company paid Montgomery County $600 per mile for right-of-way on Old Georgetown Road and Rockville Pike. In 1899, the Washington Traction and Electric Company hired Messrs. Waters and Cissel to grade the right-of-way and White & Co. to finish the roadbed and pave Rockville Pike.

By 1900, the tracks were complete from (the now-defunct) Bethesda Park to Courthouse Square in Rockville, but officials of the town refused to let streetcars begin running until the company had fulfilled its agreement to lay tracks to the Woodlawn Hotel, nearly a mile away in the westernmost section of town. In 1902, the mayor and town council began legal proceedings to compel the company to finish the line, which finally began serving the hotel in 1904.

Some northbound trolleys ran all the way from Georgetown to Rockville; others turned around at Alta Vista.

=== Consolidated operations ===
From 1895 to 1899, a consortium of three businessmen, including Oscar T. Crosby and Oscar Lieb, purchased controlling interests in several streetcar and power companies in Washington and its Maryland suburbs and swept them into a holding company named the Washington Traction and Electric Company.

In April 1895, the consortium purchased the G&T; that same year, it bought the Potomac Electric Power Company. On May 22, 1896, the T&R was purchased for $36,500 ($1,380,000 today). A newspaper account said the purchase was "for the Georgetown and Tennallytown Railway", but it was part of the consolidation into the Washington Traction. In 1897, Crosby transferred all of the T&R property, except the Bethesda Park site, into his new Washington and Rockville Railway Company.

In September 1898, a newspaper reported that Crosby had purchased 650 shares of the G&T from Francis Newlands, thus obtaining a majority share. But like Beall, Crosby's consortium borrowed too heavily, paid too much, and quickly fell into financial trouble.

In 1902, the Washington and Great Falls Electric Railway Company changed its name to the Washington Railway and Electric Company (WRECo) and reincorporated as a holding company. Three days later, it exchanged its stock for shares in Washington Traction, one-for-one at a discounted rate. This deal brought it controlling interest in the lines controlled by Washington Traction, including the G&T and W&R. The G&T would operate as a subsidiary until October 31, 1926, when the WRECo purchased the remainder of the stock.

For nearly a decade after the expansion, lines controlled by WRECo charged passengers a single five-cent ticket (six tickets could be had for 25 cents) to ride anywhere in its system. But in 1910, WRECo—more precisely, the G&T and W&R—began requiring an additional five-cent ticket for rides that crossed the District-Maryland boundary. Citizens of the D.C. neighborhood of Friendship Heights and the Montgomery County municipalities of Drummond and Somerset complained to the Interstate Commerce Commission, arguing that the hike was unjust and unreasonable under ICC rules. WRECo responded that streetcar companies were exempt from regulations governing railroads. In 1912, the ICC rejected this argument and ordered a stop to the practice.

At the time, WRECo owned all of the Washington and Rockville Company stock and about three-quarters of the Georgetown and Tenallytown Company.

Streetcars were limited to 12 mph in urban areas but could run as fast as 40 mph further out.

In 1908, a car barn was built by Samuel J. Prescott & Co. to service streetcars at 5230 Wisconsin Avenue, two blocks inside D.C. It would serve until the end of streetcar operations in 1962 and be demolished shortly thereafter.

In 1929, the W&R ran 24 trips a day, from 6:30 a.m. to 12:30 a.m., between Rockville and Washington. Stops included Georgetown, Tennallytown (later, Tenleytown), Somerset, Bethesda, Alta Vista, Bethesda Park, Montrose, Halpine, the Fairgrounds, Courthouse Square, and Chestnut Lodge.

In 1933, the Capital Transit Company was formed by combining Capital Traction Co., WRECo, and the Washington Rapid Transit bus company.

In 1935, streetcar service to Rockville ended, though service from Georgetown to points further south would continue.

In 1956, Congress passed a law permitting D.C. Commissioners to settle a strike by Capital Transit streetcar operators. The law revoked Capital Transit's franchise as of August 15, 1956, and required that a new operator—to be named D.C. Transit—provide an all-bus system.

== Remnants ==
Remnants of the line include:

- Wisconsin Avenue and Old Georgetown Road still exist
- The Bethesda Trolley Trail, a rail trail that runs along the old right-of-way
- Woodglen Drive in Rockville
