= Richard C. Drum =

American military officer and administrator (1825–1909)

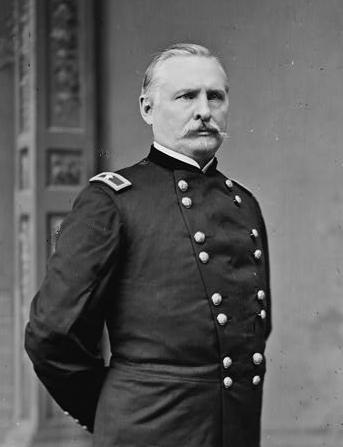
- Drum, 1865–80
- Born: May 28, 1825; Greensburg, Pennsylvania, US
- Died: October 15, 1909 (aged 84); Drummond, Maryland, US
- Burial place: Arlington National Cemetery
- Military career
- Allegiance: United States of America; Union
- Branch: United States Army; Union Army
- Service years: 1846–1889
- Rank: Brigadier General
- Commands: Adjutant General of the United States Army
- Conflicts: Mexican–American War; Siege of Veracruz; Battle of Contreras; Battle of Chapultepec; Battle for Mexico City; American Indian Wars; Battle of Ash Hollow; American Civil War; Great Railroad Strike of 1877

Richard Coulter Drum (May 28, 1825 – October 15, 1909) was an American military officer who was Adjutant General of the United States Army from 1880 to 1889. In addition to serving in the Mexican–American War early in his career, Drum's experience included the American Indian Wars, support for the Union during the American Civil War, and the Great Railroad Strike of 1877. Beginning as a private in 1846, he rose through the ranks to brigadier general before retiring in 1889. After retiring, he was vice president of the Aztec Club of 1847 from 1906 to 1907, and president from 1907 to 1908.

== Early life ==
Richard C. Drum was born in Greensburg, Pennsylvania on May 28, 1825. He graduated from Jefferson College before entering the printing business.

At the outbreak of the Mexican–American War in 1846, he enlisted as a private in the 1st Pennsylvania Volunteers, and, the next year, was commissioned a second lieutenant in the 9th Infantry of the Regular Army. He took part in many of the battles of the war, including Chapultepec and Mexico City.

Following the war, he was transferred to the Fourth Artillery and was promoted to first lieutenant. He served as an aide-de-camp for General William S. Harney during his expedition against the Sioux, and participated in the Battle of Ash Hollow.

== Civil War ==
In 1861 he was appointed as an assistant adjutant general for the far-flung Department of the Pacific and promoted to captain. He was quickly promoted to major and lieutenant colonel, and after the end of the American Civil War he was brevetted Colonel and brigadier general, for faithful and meritorious services in the Adjutant-General's Department during the war.

Drum was a companion of the District of Columbia Commandery of the Military Order of the Loyal Legion of the United States - a prestigious military society composed of officers of the Union armed forces and their descendants.

Among other honors, both Camp Drum, a 60-acre army base in Wilmington, CA, and Fort Drum, the so-called "Concrete Battleship" situated at the mouth of Manila Bay, were named for him.

== Later service ==
Drum was Assistant Adjutant General for the Department of California from June 1865 to October 1, 1866. He was appointed Assistant Adjutant General for the Department of the East, with headquarters in Philadelphia, Pennsylvania from December 27, 1866, to January 6, 1868. He was appointed Assistant Adjutant-General, for the 3rd Military District to August 1, 1868, and Department of the South, headquarters Atlanta, Georgia from March 20, 1868, to March 20, 1869, and from April 3, 1869, to November 26, 1873, for the Military Department of the Atlantic.

Drum was promoted to colonel on February 22, 1869. He was again made Assistant Adjutant-General, for the Military Division of the Missouri, in Chicago from November 28, 1873, to May 2, 1878, where he commanded the Federal troops in the Great Railroad Strike of 1877. He then served until retirement in the Adjutant Generals office in Washington, D.C.

On June 16, 1880, he became Adjutant General of the United States Army and was promoted to brigadier general. He retired on May 20, 1889.

== Death ==
General Drum died in Drummond, Maryland on October 15, 1909. He is buried in Arlington National Cemetery.

== Memberships ==
In 1871 he became a member of the Aztec Club of 1847, a military society for officers who served in the Mexican War and their descendants. In 1896 he became a Veteran Companion of the Military Order of Foreign Wars by right of his service in the Mexican–American War. He was also a Companion of the District of Columbia Commandery of the Military Order of the Loyal Legion of the United States.

Military offices
Preceded by Edward D. Townsend	Adjutant Generals of the U. S. Army; June 15, 1880 – May 28, 1889	Succeeded by John C. Kelton
