= Glen Echo Railroad =

Defunct streetcar line in Montgomery County, Maryland

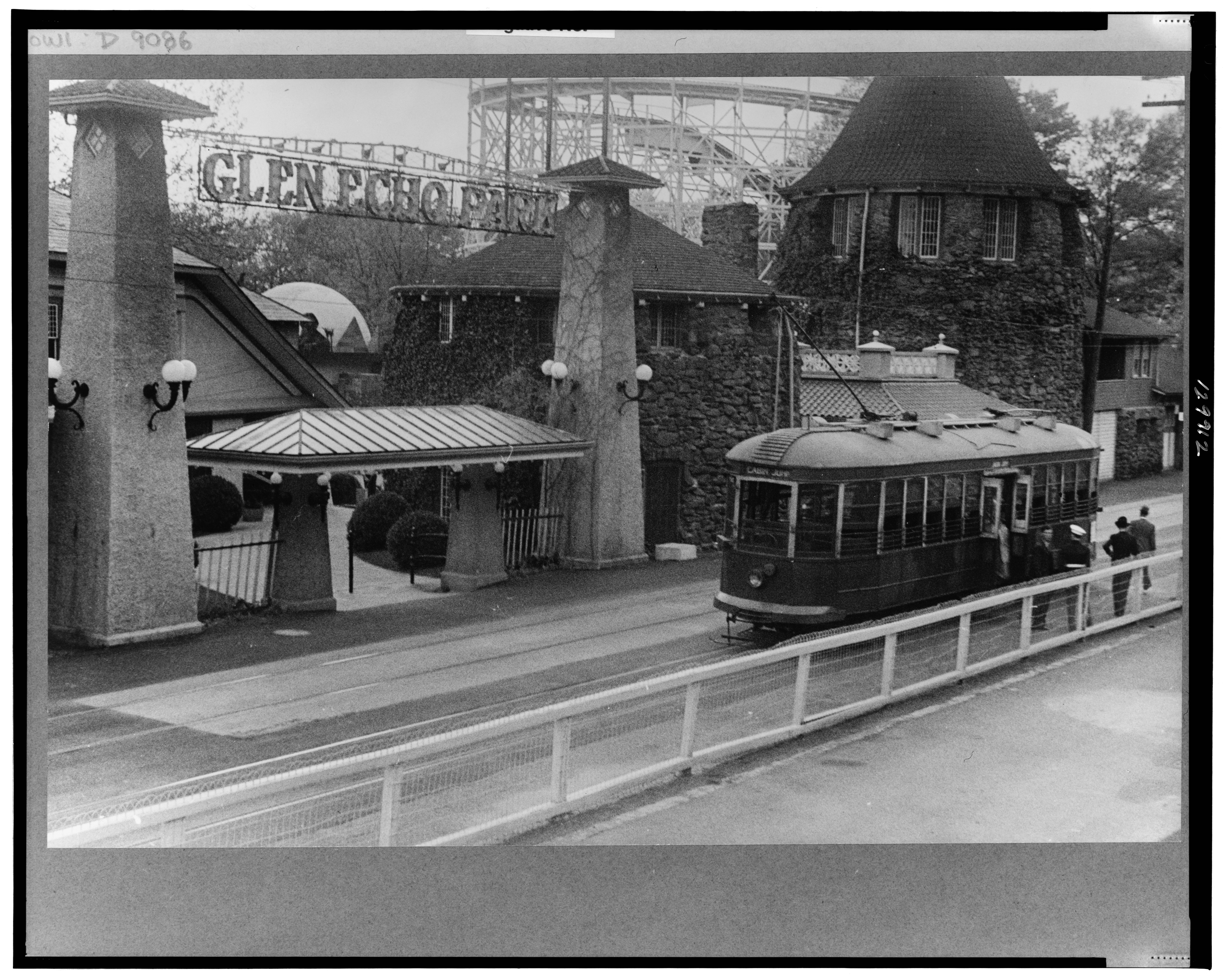
- 1939 photo of streetcar at Glen Echo Park

Overview
- Other name(s): Washington and Glen Echo Railroad
- Status: defunct
- Termini: Friendship Heights, Maryland; Cabin John, Maryland

Service
- Type: Streetcar

History
- Opened: 1891
- Closed: 1902

The Glen Echo Railroad (after 1896, the Washington and Glen Echo Railroad) was a streetcar line that operated independently in southern Montgomery County, Maryland, from 1891 to 1902. It ultimately connected the communities of Cabin John and Glen Echo to stations near present-day Friendship Heights and Chevy Chase Circle, both of which offered connections to the greater regional Washington, D.C., streetcar network.

Its Glen Echo-to-Cabin John tracks remained in service under different ownership until 1960.

== History ==
=== Founding: 1888-1895 ===
The company was chartered in 1888 and incorporated the following year by the Baltzley brothers, who founded Glen Echo, along with Frederick W. Pratt, Jason C. Pratt, Joseph Reading, Edward Crockett, and Lawrence A. Lodge as a means to connect their real estate projects to the regional trolley network.

An initial 2.5-mile line was laid from the intersection of Wisconsin Avenue and Willard Avenue near Friendship Heights (where it joined the Tennallytown and Rockville Railroad) to the intersection of Walhonding Road and Conduit Road (today's MacArthur Boulevard), where the company built a masonry car barn and powerhouse.

To draw passengers and buyers, the Baltzleys built a cafe of cedar logs at the western terminus. The cafe, dubbed "The Arcade", opened in 1890, more than a year before the railroad itself.

Eminent domain was used to acquire at least some of the right-of-way, which caused several disputes, including one that temporarily halted construction in June 1891. Operation began on June 17, 1891, nearly a year later than planned. Via connections to other streetcar lines, a passenger could ride from the Glen Echo area to the U.S. Treasury Department in downtown Washington in "about 30 minutes".

In 1895, the Washington Star reported, “The condition of the road and most of its equipment is exceedingly unattractive, the cars being old and dingy, and the tracks for nearly their entire length of three miles from the junction with the Georgetown and Tenleytown electric line to Glenn Echo, overgrown with grass and weeds."

The article continued, "There is a hope and belief on the part of many residents of this section that the Glen Echo road will before long become the property of the new Capital Traction Company. There is a gap of five-eighths of a mile between the Rock Creek road at Chevy Chase Circle and the Glen Echo road, and as but comparatively little heavy grading would have to be done the expense of building the necessary connection would be but small. In the event of this being brought about and the Glen Echo road brought up to that high state of efficiency which marks all the properties of the Capital Traction Company the latter will have a magnificent road from all parts of Washington within one mile of Cabin John bridge."

=== New owners: 1896-1899 ===
In 1896, the Baltzley brothers lost control of the streetcar company to new owners, who renamed it the Washington and Glen Echo Railroad. Securing permission to cross the Washington Aqueduct at Conduit Road, they extended the line northwest from its western terminus, reaching Glen Echo proper and continuing onward to Cabin John.

As foreseen a year earlier, the owners also planned to extend the line eastward to reach Chevy Chase Circle, where their streetcars could connect with the Capital Traction Company. But instead of running from the existing eastern terminus—the “union station” it shared with the Tennallytown and Rockville line at Wisconsin Avenue and Willard Street—the new owners envisioned a more direct route to the Circle from the Conduit-Walhonding car barn. This more northerly route would cross the Tennallytown and Rockville line about a quarter-mile north of the existing station. It would run through the town of Somerset, where the owners, said to be "Philadelphia capitalists", owned "considerable real estate at Somerset Heights".

In 1896, the company secured permission to run through land east of Wisconsin Avenue owned by the Chevy Chase Land Company. In September 1897, the Glen Echo and Capital Traction companies were reported to have agreed an "important deal" under which the Glen Echo line would be extended to a planned junction with the Capital Traction line below Chevy Chase Circle, and its cars would run all the way to 7th and U Streets NW, while Capital Traction cars would run all the way to Glen Echo.

Ridership on the Washington and Glen Echo declined after the Washington and Great Falls Electric Railway, which had begun running trains from Georgetown to the Maryland state line in 1895, completed its line to Cabin John in 1897. (As of January 1898, the W&GFER's line extended to the southern end of the Union Arch Bridge, which carried the Washington Aqueduct across Cabin John Creek. The W&GE had trackage rights on the W&GFER's line from Conduit Road to about a half-mile short of the bridge, just north of the Chatauqua site in a subdivision called Idlewood. But the W&GE sought to extend its service under the bridge and into Cabin John proper, and was at the time laying track north of Idlewood.)

Still, the company pressed on with its extension through Chevy Chase. On January 7, 1898, the railroad received approval from the Senate Committee on the District of Columbia to lay 600 feet of track in the District—"which, by the way, has already been constructed", the Evening Times-Herald reported.

Then in August, Glen Echo Railroad work crews, under cover of darkness, "succeeded in placing a switch on the Great Falls Electric Railroad, which gives it a clear track from near Idlewood to Cabin John Bridge, about a quarter of a mile." By November, the railroad had nearly completed its line to the bridge, laying tracks "almost parallel with the Conduit road" and building a trestle over a ravine. After it was discovered that the tracks ran over a "foot or so" of land owned not by the railroad but by "Mr. Baltzley", the company had a jury of condemnation convened, which judged that the railroad could get the use of the land for $50. The newspaper calculated that this was a rate of $750,000 (about $32.1 million today) per acre.

By year's end, the line was complete. The Glen Echo and Capital Traction companies began running ads for their new service, which could take passengers from "Heart of the City to Cabin John Bridge": "Take 7th or 14th street cars to U Street, transfer for Chevy Chase, there take Glen Echo cars for Cabin John Bridge". Streetcars departed the Chevy Chase and Cabin John termini every 30 minutes, and every 20 minutes on Sunday and Monday.

=== Consolidation ===
In the late 1890s, pressure was building on the region's streetcar companies to merge, and thereby reduce the need to transfer between independent lines. The owners of the Washington and Glen Echo Railroad aimed to absorb other companies, rather than be absorbed. In September 1898, local newspapers reported rumors that they were contemplating a stock takeover of the Georgetown and Tenleytown Railroad. But the G&T's largest shareholder foiled the effort by purchasing the stock held by its second-largest shareholder: Chevy Chase Land Company founder Francis Newlands.

In 1899, the "great streetcar consolidation" took its largest single step, sweeping the Glen Echo into the Washington Traction and Electric Company—along with every other streetcar company in and around Washington, D.C., except the Capital Traction Company and Mount Vernon line.

In 1902, the WT&EC was reorganized into the Washington Railway and Electric Company.

=== Aftermath ===
The section from Walhonding Road to Cabin John was incorporated into the W&GFER. The power system was removed and reused elsewhere in DC. The tracks from Tenallytown to Conduit were removed, likely for scrap. The carbarn was abandoned and quickly fell into disrepair and by the late 1930s, it was in ruins with few walls over eight feet tall remaining. By the 1950s, nearly all trace of the structure was gone.

A few remnants of the original line remain. Railroad tracks, a "frog" (part of a switchback) and the trestle abutments remain visible in Willard Avenue Neighborhood Park in Bethesda, Maryland. A few squared blocks from the carbarn can be found in the yard of a nearby home.

== See also ==
- Streetcars in Washington, D.C., and Maryland
