= Streetcars in Washington, D.C., and Maryland =

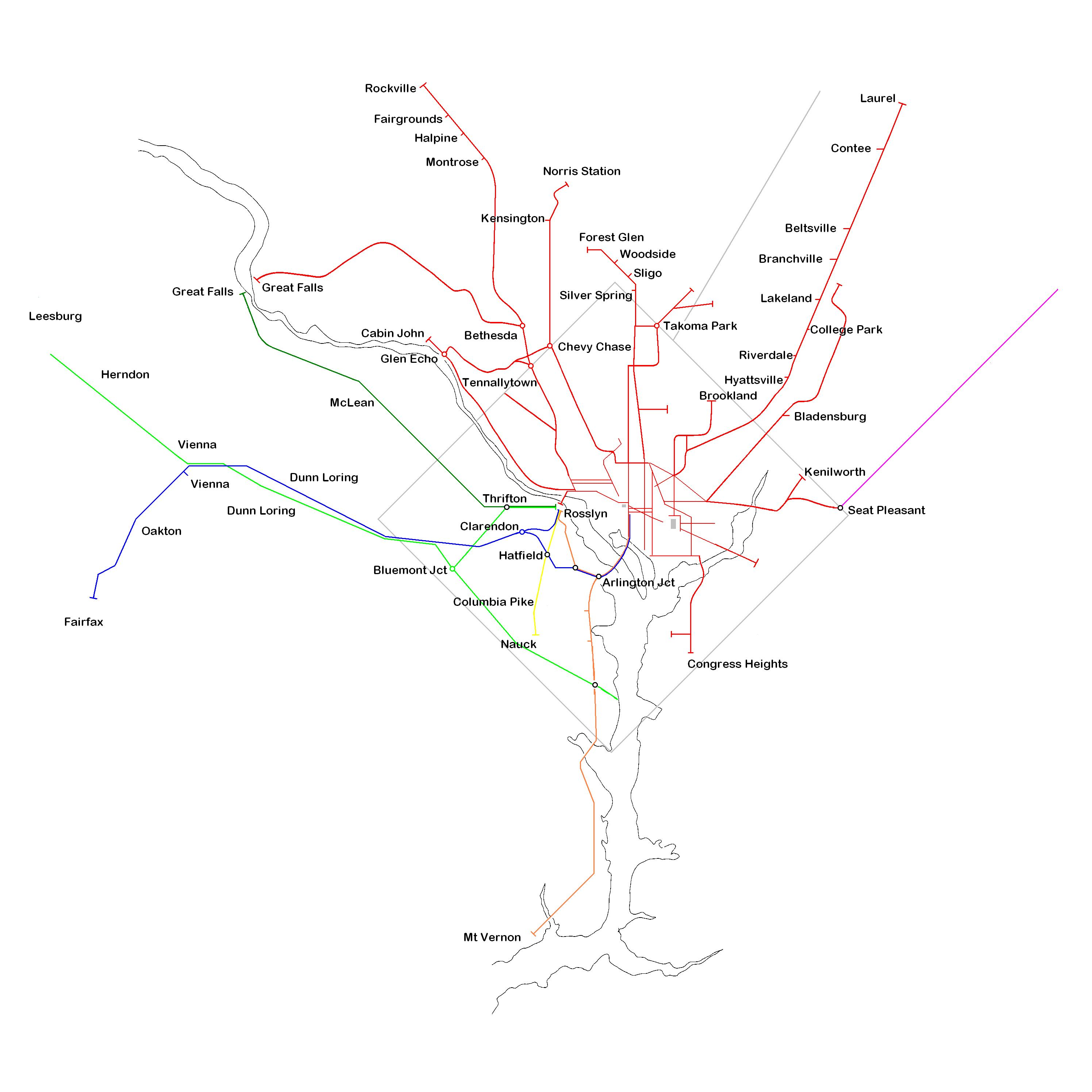
System diagram of all electric railway lines in the Washington area. Not all lines operated at the same time.

Streetcars and interurbans operated in the Maryland suburbs of Washington, D.C., between 1890 and 1962.

Lines in Maryland were established as separate legal entities, most with grand plans in mind, but none succeeded financially. Eventually they were all owned or leased by DC Transit (see Streetcars in Washington, D.C.). Unlike the Virginia lines, the combined Washington and Maryland lines were scheduled as a single system. A combination of the rise of the automobile, various economic downturns and bustitution eventually spelled the end of streetcars in southern Maryland.

== Companies ==
=== Rock Creek Railway ===
One of the first electric streetcar companies in Washington, D.C., the Rock Creek Railway was incorporated in 1888 and started operations in 1890. After expansion, the line ran from the Cardoza/Shaw neighborhood of D.C. to Chevy Chase Lake in Maryland. On September 21, 1895, the company purchased the Washington and Georgetown Railroad Company and the two formed the Capital Traction Company.

Remnants include the Chevy Chase Lake station that was disassembled in 1980 and moved to Hyattstown, Maryland.

=== Tennallytown and Rockville Railroad ===
A trio of streetcar companies provided service from Georgetown north and ultimately to Rockville, Maryland. The first one was the Georgetown and Tennallytown Railway, chartered on August 22, 1888, and just the third D.C. streetcar company to incorporate. It began operations in 1890 on a route that ran up from M Street NW up 32nd Street NW and then onto the Georgetown and Rockville Road (now Wisconsin Avenue NW) to the extant village of Tenleytown. That same year, the Tennallytown and Rockville Railway received its charter and began building tracks from the G&T's northern terminus to today's D.C. neighborhood of Friendship Heights and the Maryland state line. Finally, the Washington and Rockville Electric Railway was incorporated in 1897 to extend the tracks into Maryland line and onward to Bethesda and Rockville. Controlling interest in the companies was obtained first by the Washington Traction and Electric Company, then in 1902 by the Washington Railway and Electric Company. Streetcar service was replaced with buses in 1935.

=== Glen Echo Railroad ===
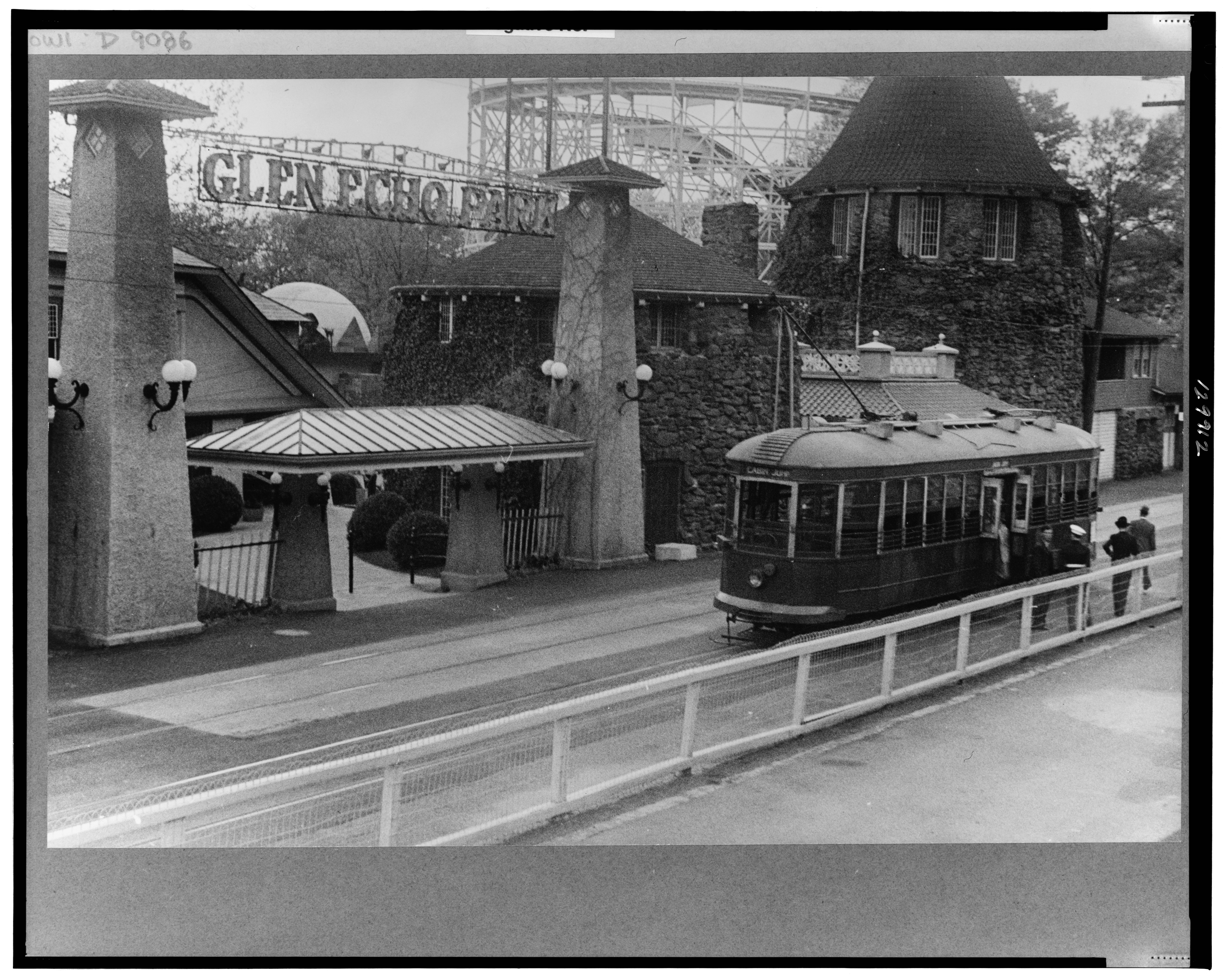
1939 photo of streetcar at Glen Echo Park

The Glen Echo Railroad was chartered in 1888 and incorporated the following year by the Baltzley brothers, who founded Glen Echo, and five other businessmen as a means to connect their real estate projects to the regional trolley system. Initially, its 2.5-mile line ran from the Tennallytown and Rockville Railroad terminal at Wisconsin Avenue and Willard Avenue near Friendship Heights to a masonry car barn and powerhouse at Conduit Road (today's Macarthur Boulevard) near the intersection of Walhonding Road. Operation began on June 17, 1891, nearly a year later than planned. Via connections to other streetcar lines, a passenger could ride from the Glen Echo area to the U.S. Treasury Department in downtown Washington in "about 30 minutes".

In 1896, the Baltzley brothers lost control of the streetcar company. The new owners renamed it the Washington and Glen Echo Railroad and extended the line northwest from its western terminus, reaching Glen Echo proper and continuing onward to Cabin John.

Ridership on the Washington and Glen Echo declined after the 1897 opening of the Washington and Great Falls Electric Railway (W&GFER) from Georgetown to Glen Echo. By 1900 it was practically closed; it ceased operations entirely in 1902. The section from Walhonding Road to Cabin John was incorporated into the W&GFER. The power system was removed and reused elsewhere in DC. The tracks from Tenallytown to Conduit were removed, likely for scrap.

A few remnants remain. Railroad tracks, a "frog" (part of a switchback) and the trestle abutments remain visible in Willard Avenue Neighborhood Park in Bethesda, Maryland. A few squared blocks from the carbarn can be found in the yard of a nearby home.

=== Washington and Great Falls Electric Railway ===
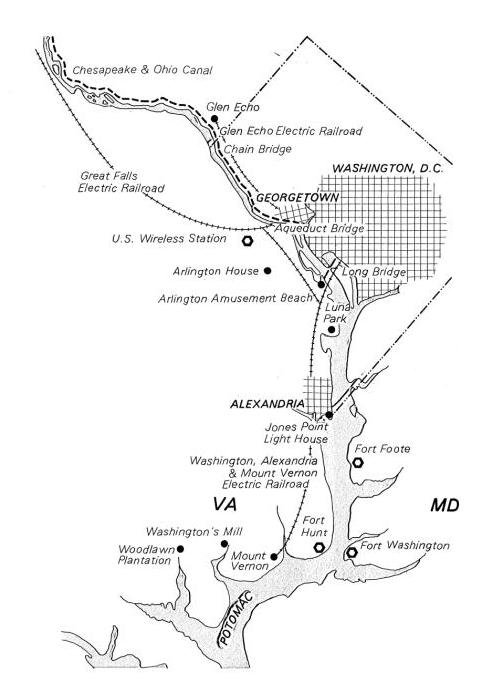
Diagram of electric railroad routes near the Potomac River, showing the Glen Echo Electric Railroad" (the Washington and Great Falls Electric Railway), the "Great Falls Electric Railroad" (the Great Falls and Old Dominion Railroad) and the East Arlington branch and the Washington-Mount Vernon line of the Washington, Alexandria, and Mount Vernon Electric Railway

In 1892, the Baltzley brothers incorporated the Washington and Great Falls Electric Railway Company (W&GFER) (aka the West Washington and Great Falls Electric Railroad), aiming to build a line to connect Georgetown to Great Falls. They built a line from the Georgetown Car Barn on 36th and Prospect Streets, running in a private right-of-way along the lands of the Washington Aqueduct to Glen Echo about 100 feet south of the Glen Echo Railway's car barn on Walhonding which opened by early 1897. From there it used the tracks of the Glen Echo Railroad to reach Cabin John.

Because the railroad never reached Great Falls, but instead terminated at Cabin John, it was often referred to as the "Cabin John Trolley".

In 1897, vaudeville came to the old Chautauqua Amphitheatre located along the line, which generated business for the trolley. Two years later, Glen Echo began installing amusement rides on the Chautauqua land which led to even more trolley riders. The W&GFER rented the land and sublet it to promoters.

In 1902, the W&GFER purchased the bankrupt Washington Traction and Electric Company, a holding company for 10 streetcar lines. The merged company was renamed the Washington Railway and Electric Company (WREC). In 1903, WREC bought the Glen Echo property and turned it into an amusement park.

In 1928, WREC and the Capital Traction Company decided to merge and simultaneously purchase the Washington Rapid Transit Company and split off the power companies, with certain provisions favoring each company. After years of negotiations, the two were merged in 1933 and the Cabin John line became the #20 streetcar route.

Following a seven-week transit strike in 1955, Capital Transit lost its franchise, which was awarded to a new company, D.C. Transit, and included a mandate to terminate streetcars by 1963. The railway line to Cabin John was abandoned in 1960, in the second batch of abandonments. The former roadbed is still discernible in The Palisades and in Montgomery County, Maryland.

=== City and Suburban Railway ===
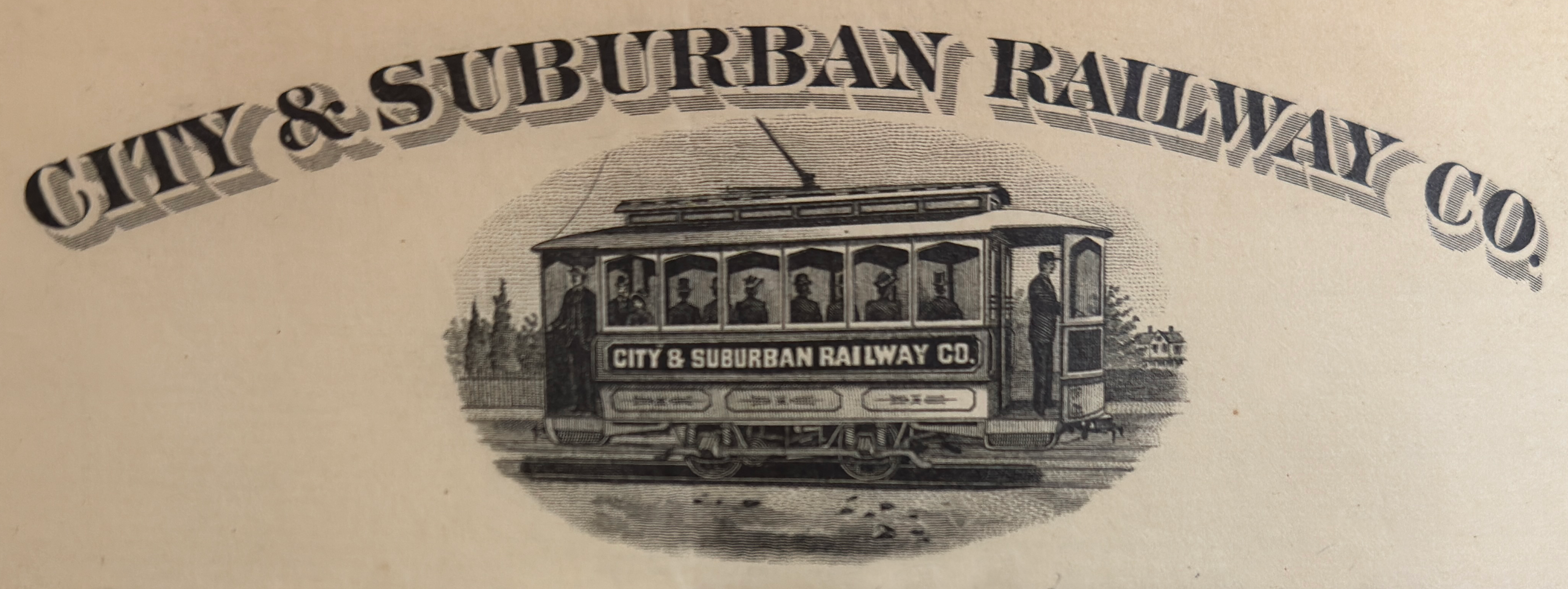
Washington and Baltimore street railway graphic from 1894

The City and Suburban Railway was chartered in 1890 to run a streetcar from just east of the White House at New York Avenue and 15th Street NW to what is now Mount Rainier, Maryland, just over the D.C. border.

The line reached Mount Rainier in 1897. In 1898, it merged with the Eckington and Soldiers' Home Railway and continued building tracks, reaching Brentwood in 1898 and Hyattsville and Riverdale in 1899. The company was also building a line south from Baltimore, making it as far as Ellicott City. The two lines never connected and the Baltimore line became Trolley Line Number 9.

Meanwhile, on March 31, 1892, the Maryland and Washington Railway incorporated to build a rail line connecting any passenger railway in the District of Columbia to Branchville and eventually Laurel. The company had difficulty raising money, and on April 4, 1896, merged with several other struggling streetcar companies to create the Columbia and Maryland Railway, which presently renamed itself the Berwyn and Laurel Electric Railroad Company. It began building tracks from the end of the City and Suburban line in Riverdale to College Park, reaching Laurel by 1902, when it changed its name again, this time to the Washington, Berwyn and Laurel Electric Railroad Company.

City and Suburban later acquired the Berwyn and Laurel. At its peak, the City and Suburban served the cities of Hyattsville, Riverdale, College Park, Lakeland, Berwyn, Branchville, Beltsville, Contee, and Laurel.

In 1926, it was absorbed by the WREC, which in 1933 became part of Capital Transit and in 1955, of DC Transit. The line was truncated at Beltsville by 1948 and at Berwyn by 1956. In 1956, Congress decided to replace the streetcars with buses; on September 7, 1958, Route 82 was among the first abandoned.

==== Post-abandonment ====
In 1963, D.C. Transit proposed to use the right-of-way for a monorail from the Goddard Space Flight Center on the north and the District on the south after an earlier proposal for a monorail on the median of Veirs Mill Road was ruled out.

In the 1970s, Maryland acquired the line from the District to Farragut Street in Hyattsville and, by 1980, used it to widen Rhode Island Ave/Route 1. Portions of the right-of-way were taken over by the Riders Fund in 1993, along with the Cabin John right-of-way. Much of it was eventually sold for the Rhode Island Avenue Rail Trail.

Remnants of the line include:

- Stations
  - 4701 Queensbury Road, Riverdale Park
  - 531 Main Street, Laurel, now Oliver's Old Towne Tavern
- Roads
  - The bus turnaround north of the intersection of Rhode Island Avenue and 34th Street in Mount Rainier used to be a streetcar turnaround
  - Part of Rhode Island Avenue/Route 1 from the District Line to Farragut Street in Hyattsville
  - Rhode Island Avenue Trolley Trail

=== Washington, Woodside and Forest Glen Railway Power Company ===
The Washington, Woodside and Forest Glen Railway, aka the "Forest Glen Trolley", was incorporated on July 26, 1895, and built a 2.9-mile line that opened on November 25, 1897. A single ride cost five cents. The streetcar ran from the terminus of the Brightwood Railway at Eastern Avenue and Georgia Avenue along the west side of Georgia Avenue and then along what is now Seminary Road to the National Park Seminary, a fashionable school for girls in Forest Glen, at Forest Glen Road. This line faced competition from passenger service on the Metropolitan Branch of the Baltimore and Ohio Railroad. The line was shut down on December 15, 1924, in preparation for construction of the first Georgia Avenue underpass under the B&O Railroad. The underpass was built with one lane for the trolley tracks, but the trolley never resumed operation.

Stations on the line were:

- Silver Spring
- Sligo
- Woodside
- Forest Glen

=== The Kensington Railway ===
Incorporated in 1894, the Chevy Chase Lake & Kensington Railway began operation on May 30, 1895, along a single-track line beginning at the northern terminus of the old Rock Creek Railway at Chevy Chase Lake along Connecticut Avenue and running north to a station on University Boulevard in Kensington. Purchased at foreclosure and renamed the Kensington Railway, the line was extended several times, and in 1916 reached its fullest extent to a station a mile and a half north. From 1923 to 1933, the line was leased by Capital Traction. Returned to independent operations, the railroad ran its last car on September 15, 1935, the last car ran its route. When the line south of the Kensington was replaced with buses, the railway no longer had access to power and operations were suspended. It never reopened.

The right-of-way was eventually converted into Kensington Parkway. Its trestle over Rock Creek was dismantled, but its stone abutments survive, just east of the parkway.

=== The Baltimore and Washington Transit Company ===
Incorporated on April 7, 1896, the B&W Transit Company began construction the following year on an electric street railway system, that would become known locally as the Dinky Line. Beginning in Washington, D.C., it ran south from Umatilla Street (today's Butternut Street NW) on 4th Street NW, turned east on Tahoe Street (today's Aspen Street NW) and continued on Spring Street (today's Laurel Street NW) into Maryland. It continued on Ethan Allen Avenue until it reached the popular Wildwood Resort and Glen Sligo Hotel on Sligo Creek, which sat about midway between Elm Avenue and Sligo Creek Parkway, on what is Heather Avenue today. In 1903, the Takoma Park city council took over the lease given by the B&W Transit Company and the resort was closed for illegal gambling. The tracks were removed some two years later and the right-of-way reverted to the town. In 1920, the hotel was torn down and the property subdivided into individual lots. In 1937, the tracks were completely dismantled.

=== The Washington, Spa Spring and Gretta Railroad Company ===
Began in 1910 as a single-track trolley line. It ran from a car barn at 15th and H Street NE in Washington along Bladensburg Road to Bladensburg. The line was initially planned to run as far as Gettysburg, Pennsylvania, but service was only extended as far as Berwyn Heights. (This happened in 1912 using battery cars.) The line became the Washington Interurban Railway in 1912 and the Washington Interurban Railroad Company in 1916. In 1923 the streetcars were replaced by buses and the tracks removed when Bladensburg Road was paved.

=== Washington and Great Falls Railway and Power Company ===
From 1913 to 1921, the Washington and Great Falls Railway and Power Company operated a 10.66-mile line to Great Falls from Bethesda—specifically, from a junction with the Washington and Rockville Railway at Wisconsin Avenue and Bradley Lane. The only streetcar line ever to actually reach Great Falls, it was a project of developers looking to attract customers to their land west of Wisconsin Avenue.

The developers incorporated the WGFRPC on May 29, 1912, and on December 4, received permission from Maryland's Public Service Commission to hire the Chevy Chase to Great Falls Land Corporation to build the rail line. The right-of-way became Bradley Boulevard from Wisconsin to River Road, then followed its own route to its western terminus.

Sometime between 1912 and 1914, the WGFRPC built a transformer station in the form of a stone farmhouse to boost power to the trolleys running the route. The structure was later converted into a residence; it still stands at 8100 Bradley Boulevard, a road created largely by paving over the former trolley right-of-way.

The line opened on July 2, 1913. The developers were uninterested in operating a streetcar as a business, and so paid the Washington Railway & Electric Company—specifically, its Washington and Rockville Railway subsidiary—to furnish, operate, and power the rolling stock.

It was generally operated as a stub, and often with just a single trolley shuttling back and forth. "However, for at least a while, a through service was operated to downtown Washington, with cars from Great Falls running all the way to 8th Street," the National Capital Trolley Museum wrote in 2012. Some passengers rode to the Great Falls Tavern; also known as the Great Falls Hotel. The railroad ceased operations on February 12, 1921, and the tracks were removed in 1926.

Remnants of the line include the Gold Mine Spur Trail in Chesapeake and Ohio National Historical Park, which uses about 1,000 feet of the Washington and Great Falls rail bed and cut.

== Interurbans ==
- Washington, Baltimore and Annapolis Electric Railroad, 1908 – 1935

== Trolley parks ==
- Glen Echo Park
- Great Falls Park
- Marshall Hall
- Chevy Chase Lake

== See also ==
- 1880 map of D.C. streetcar lines
- Washington Metro
- Urban rail transit
- Bustitution
- Trolley park
- National Capital Trolley Museum
- Map of Montgomery Country streetcar lines
