= Bethesda Trolley Trail =

Paved biking/walking trail between Bethesda and Rockville in Maryland

Coordinates: 39°0′56″N 77°6′43″W

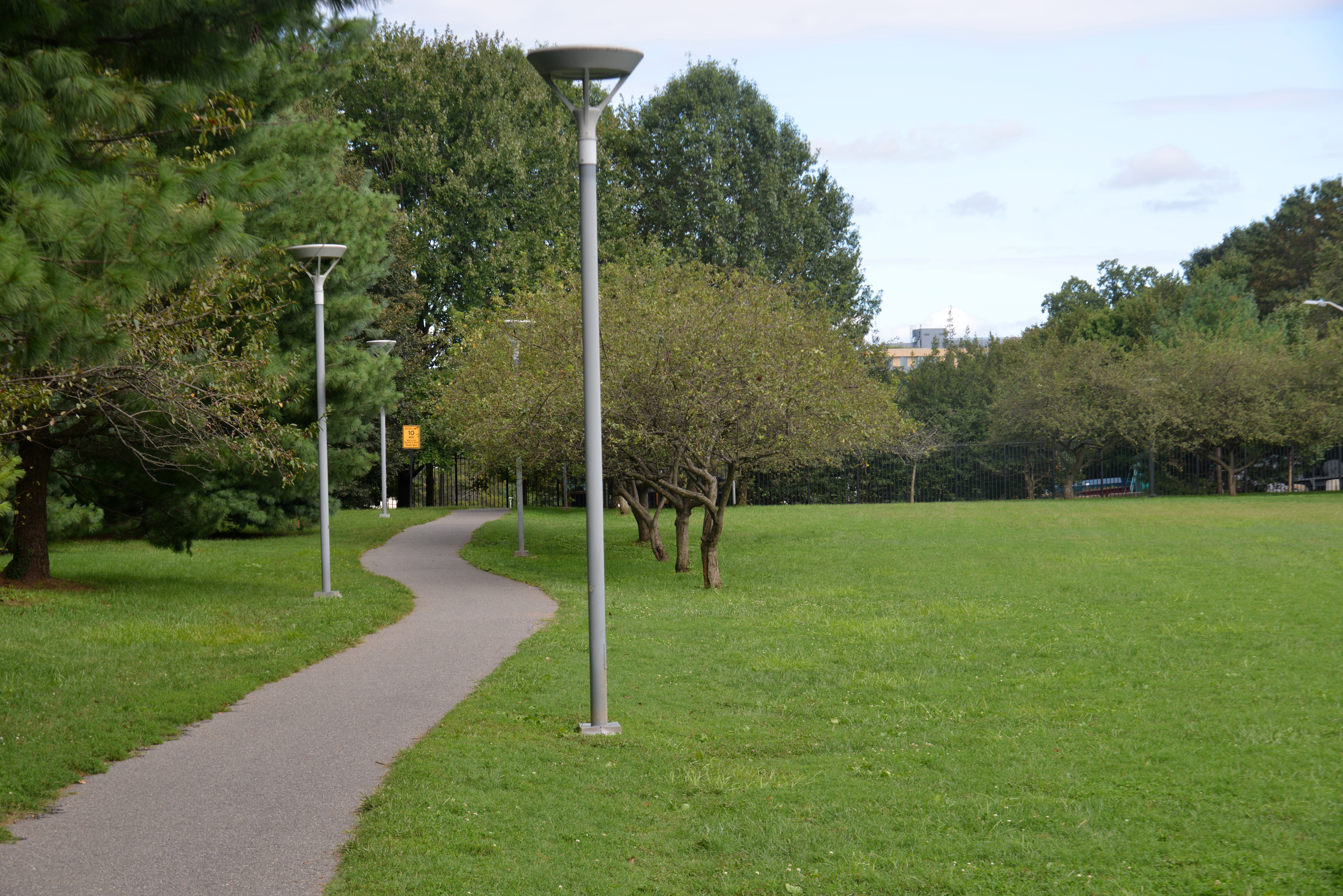
- Bethesda Trolley Trail at the NIH Campus, Bethesda, Maryland.
- Length: 5.9 mi (9.5 km)
- Location: Montgomery County, Maryland
- Use: Walking, Jogging, Biking
- Difficulty: Easy, level, ADA accessible
- Season: Year-round
- Months: Year-round
- Surface: Asphalt

The Bethesda Trolley Trail, at one time known as the North Bethesda Trail, is a 5.9-mile (9.5 km) rail trail in southern Montgomery County, Maryland. It runs from Bouic Avenue next to the Twinbrook Metro Station in the city of Rockville to Battery Lane Park in Bethesda.

The trail runs primarily on the abandoned right-of-way of the streetcar line that connected Bethesda to Rockville, but also partially on roads, sidewalks, and side paths.

== History ==
In 1891, the Tennallytown (Tenleytown) and Rockville Railroad began operations along a line that came north to Bethesda on Wisconsin Avenue, turned left on Old Georgetown Road, and terminated at Bethesda Park, a 50-acre amusement park built by the railroad on the west side of Old Georgetown Road between the modern-day streets of Cedar and Greentree Road. By 1900, the Washington and Rockville Electric Railway had laid tracks from the T&R's terminus to Rockville, though full operation would begin only in 1904. Streetcars stopped running to Rockville in 1935, when the service was converted to buses. Some of the right-of-way then sat fallow for decades.

Building a trail on the unused part of the right-of-way was first suggested in Montgomery County's 1978 Countywide Bikeways Master Plan. Design of the trail began in the early 1990s. Construction was held up for many years by opposition from neighbors and lack of funding. Funding for the bridges over I-495 and I-270 was approved in 1999.

Construction of the trail began in fall of 2000 and lasted nearly a decade. Money to rebuild existing sections of the trail was diverted to the Forest Glen Metro overpass project, delaying work on the trail. Work was further delayed by the bridge fabrication. Bridges over I-495 and I-270 opened in 2002 and 2003 respectively, adding to narrow, discontinuous sections that existed before 2002 between Nicholson Lane and Beech Avenue. Paving and building the missing trail segments from the Old Georgetown Pike/Cedar Lane intersection to the intersection of Randolph Road with Rockville Pike began in November 2005, and continued into 2006. Between Charles Street and Cedar Lane and north of Nicholson Lane, the trail was on sidewalks. Around the same time, the National Institutes of Health (NIH) built a trail along the south edge of their facility, which connected Rugby Avenue to the sidewalk along Old Georgetown Road. In 2008, the new sections of the trail, including the sidewalks, received signage. As part of the Montrose Parkway West project in 2009, a section of trail — a side path along Rockville Pike — was constructed from Per Sei Place to Hubbard Drive, north of the North Bethesda Metro Station. That section connected to a path built along Montrose Parkway at the same time.

Bethesda Trolley Trail

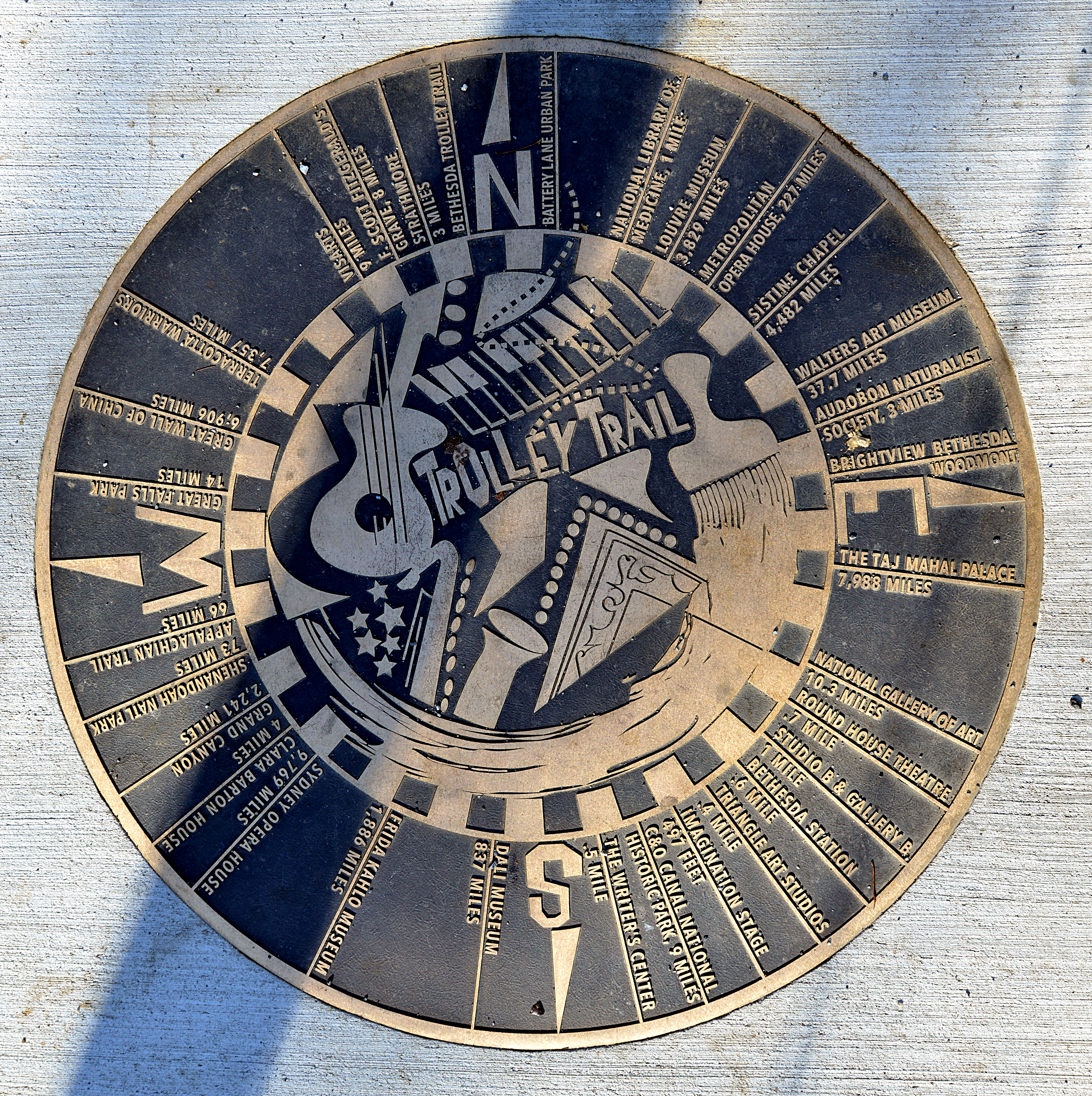
Marker at the start of the Bethesda Trolley Trail

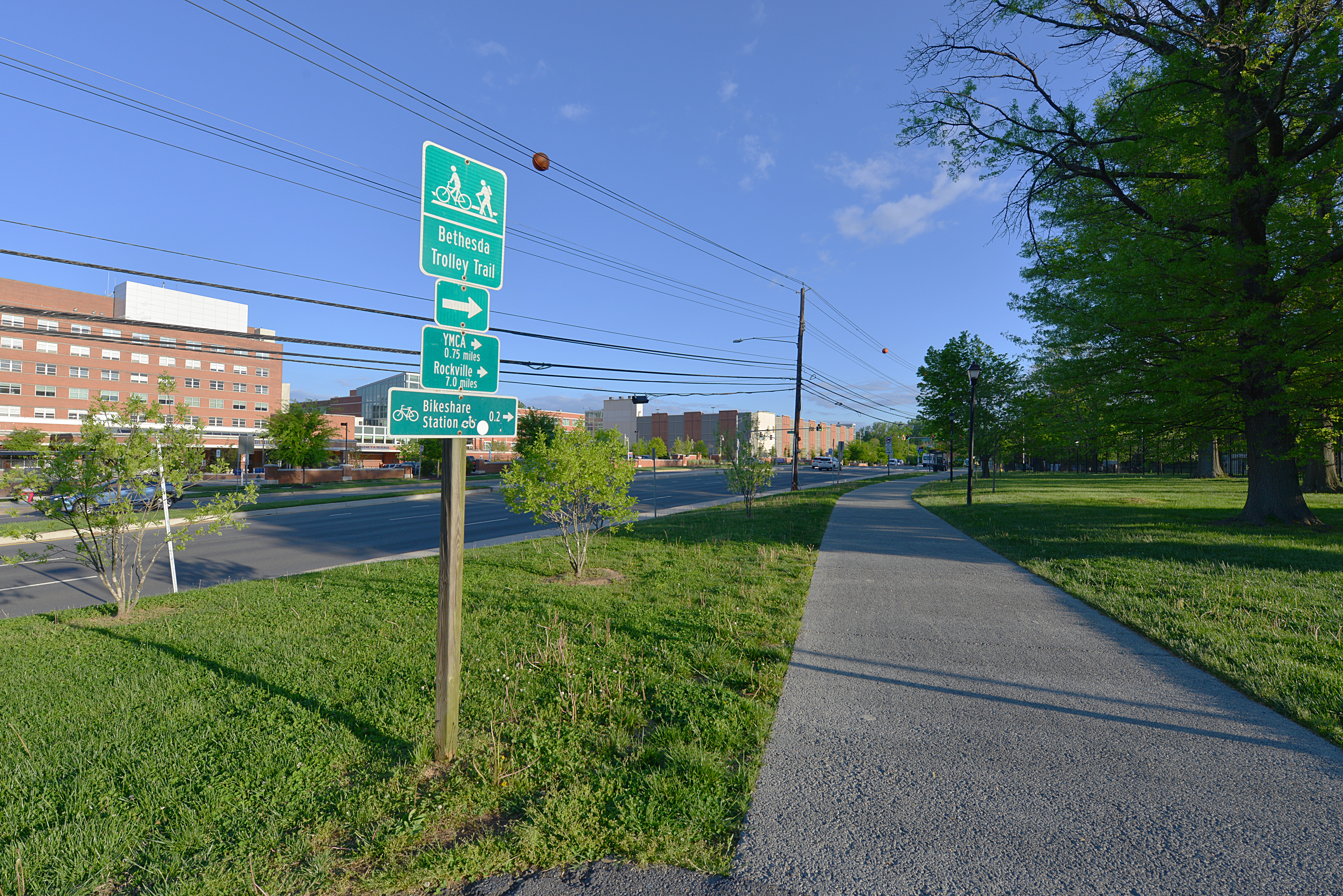
Bethesda Trolley Trail along Old Georgetown Road in Bethesda

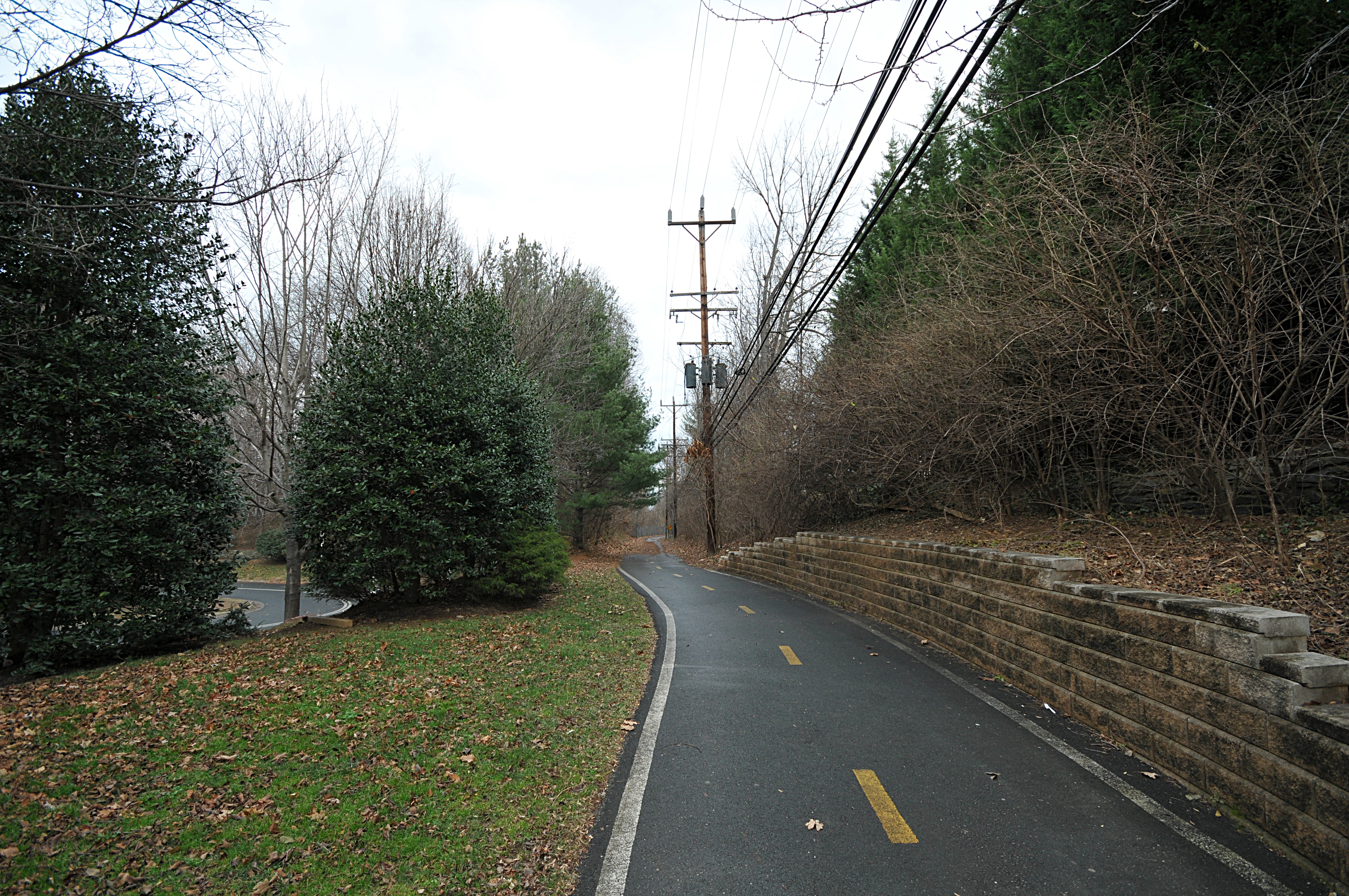
Bethesda Trolley Trail at Montgomery Drive

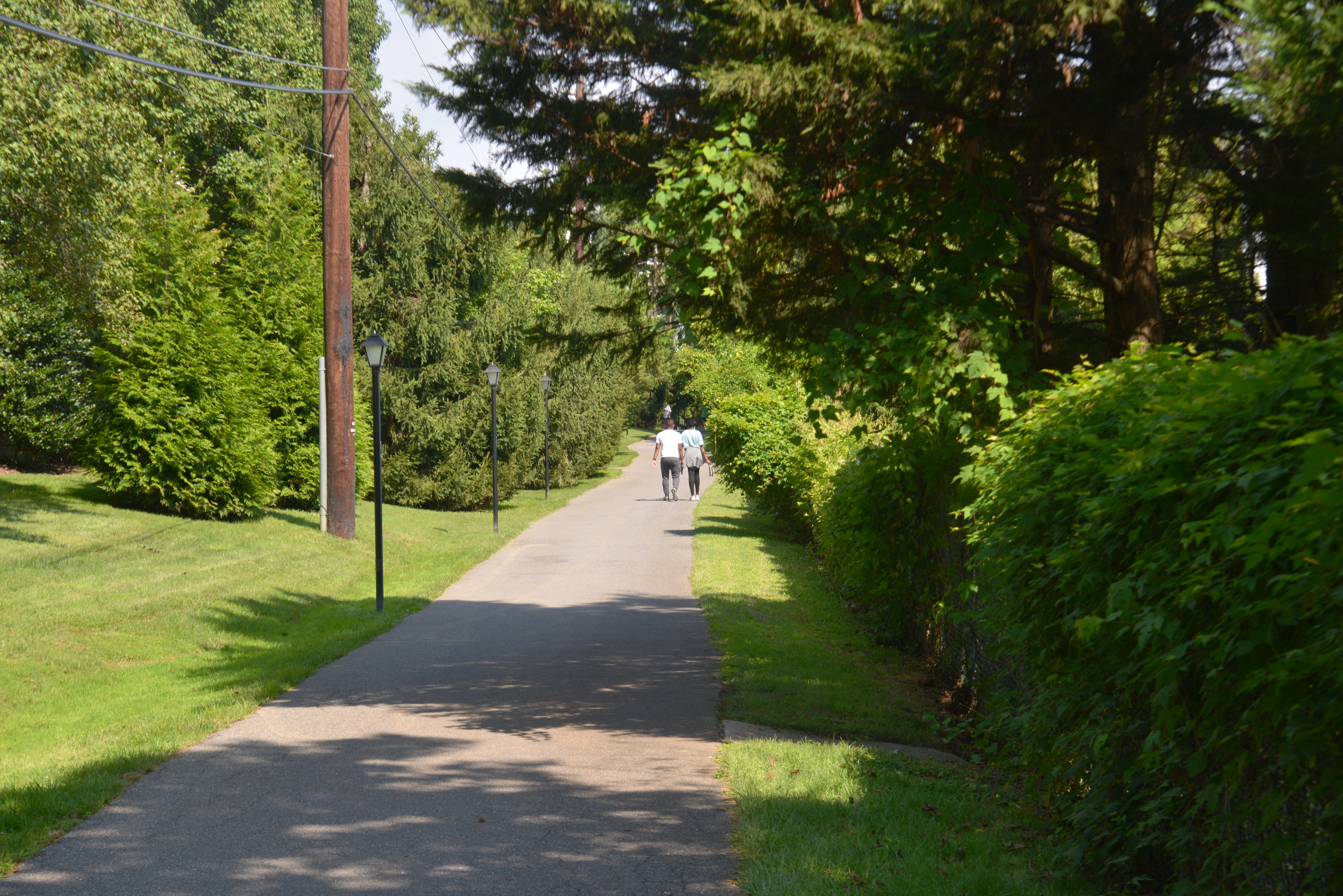
Bethesda Trolley Trail near Georgetown Preparatory School in North Bethesda

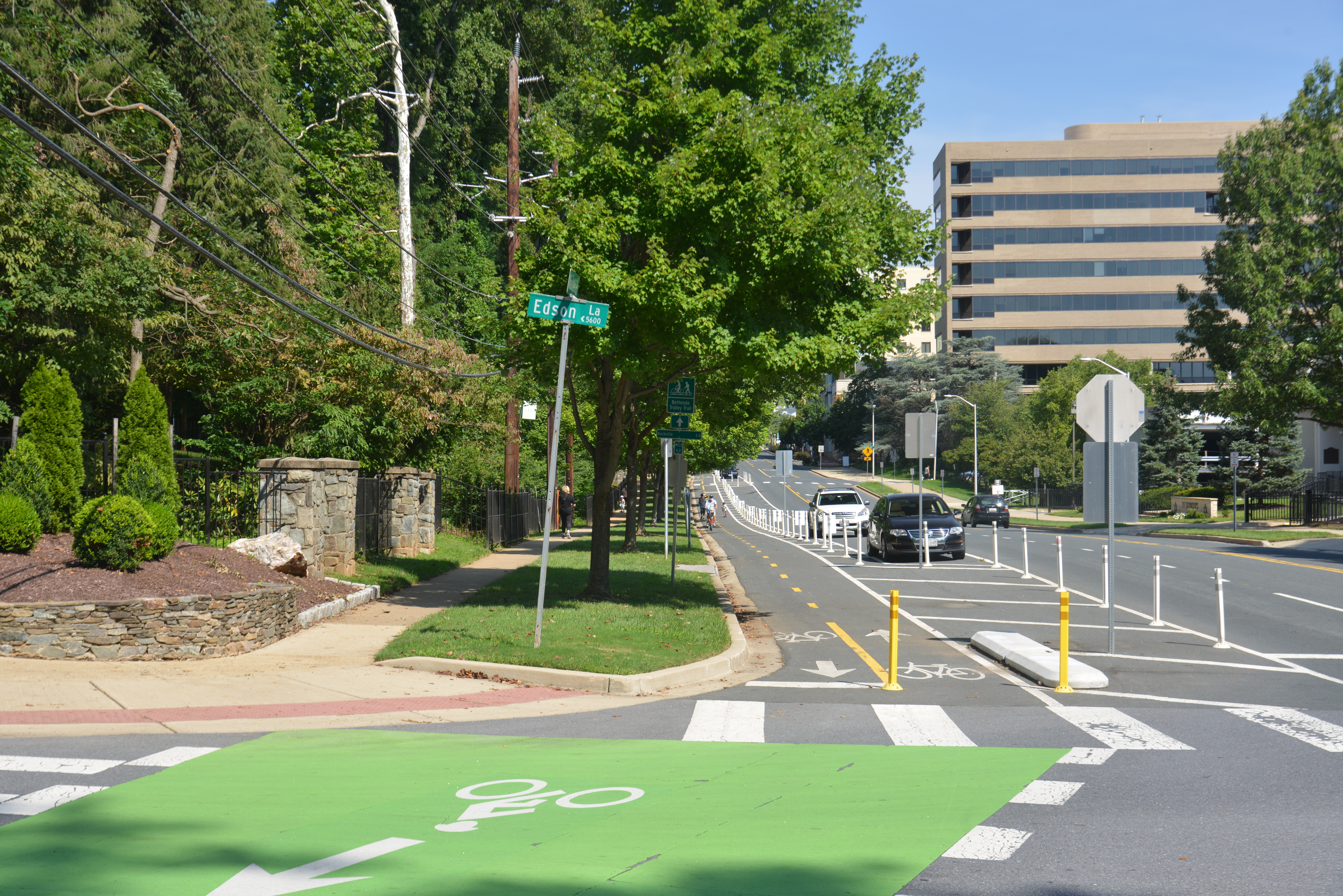
Bethesda Trolley Trail at Edson Ln and Woodglen Drive in North Bethesda
