= Cabin John-Brookmont, Maryland =

Cabin John-Brookmont
- Former CDP
- Location within the state of Maryland Cabin John-Brookmont (the United States)
- Coordinates: 38°58′02″N 77°08′51″W
- Country: United States
- State: Maryland
- Counties: Montgomery

Area
  - Land: 2.6 sq mi (6.8 km^{2})
  - Water: 0.97 sq mi (2.5 km^{2})
- Elevation: 36 ft (11 m)

Population (1990)
  - Total: 5,341
  - Density: 2,000/sq mi (790/km^{2})
- Time zone: UTC−5 (Eastern (EST))
  - Summer (DST): UTC−4 (EDT)
- ZIP codes: 20816, 20818
- Area codes: 240 & 301
- FIPS code: 24-12087

Cabin John-Brookmont was a census-designated place in Montgomery County, Maryland (adjacent to Washington, D.C.) during the 1980 and 1990 censuses, which included the primary communities of Cabin John and Brookmont. The population recorded in 1990 was 5,341 and consisted of 2,168 housing units. The census area disbanded to form Cabin John and Brookmont in 2000. The ZIP codes serving the area are 20816 and 20818.

== Geography ==
Historical population
Census	Pop.	Note	%±
1980	5,135		—
1990	5,341		4.0%

Located at 38.96737 north and 77.14763 west, the census area of Cabin John-Brookmont was bounded by the census areas of Potomac to the northwest, McLean (the Potomac River) to the south and Bethesda to the northeast. The land area of the CDP was 2.7 square miles.
