= Brookmont, Maryland =

- Census-designated place
- Location in Montgomery County and Maryland
- Coordinates: 38°57′05″N 77°07′35″W
- Country: United States
- State: Maryland
- County: Montgomery

Area
  - Total: 1.97 sq mi (5.11 km^{2})
  - Land: 1.31 sq mi (3.40 km^{2})
  - Water: 0.66 sq mi (1.72 km^{2})
- Elevation: 121 ft (37 m)

Population (2020)
  - Total: 3,751
  - Density: 2,861.1/sq mi (1,104.68/km^{2})
- Time zone: UTC−5 (Eastern (EST))
  - Summer (DST): UTC−4 (EDT)
- ZIP Code: 20816 (Bethesda)
- FIPS code: 24-10500
- GNIS feature ID: 2389249

Brookmont is a census-designated place and unincorporated area in Montgomery County, Maryland, United States. As of the 2020 census, it had a population of 3,751. Brookmont is often considered part of neighboring Bethesda because it falls within Bethesda's 20816 zip code.

== History ==
Before becoming a neighborhood, Brookmont's one mile loop was used as a velodrome for local bikers. What is now the neighborhood green was originally a part of the Glen Echo Railroad, connecting Glen Echo and Cabin John to Washington DC.

Prior to the passage of the Fair Housing Act of 1968, racial covenants were used in Brookmont to exclude African Americans. A 1925 deed for a property owned by A. J. Watkins Realty Corporation said that "At no time shall the above described lot, or any part thereof, or any building thereon be sold, leased or transferred to, or occupied by any negro or person of negro descent. This provision, however, not to include occupancy by servants or any employee of owner or occupant of said lot." Brookmont celebrated its 100th anniversary in June 2025.

The Brookmont community also includes a church build in 1941 on Virginia Place at the corner of Broad Street. Originally a Baptist Church, the building now serves as a community space and day care.

== Geography ==
As an unincorporated area, Brookmont's boundaries are not officially defined. Brookmont is, however, recognized by the United States Census Bureau as a census-designated place, and by the United States Geological Survey as a populated place located at 38°57′21″N 77°7′38″W (38.955810, −77.127094). Brookmont occupies the southernmost point in Montgomery County and is bordered to the southeast by the District of Columbia and to the southwest, across the Potomac River, by McLean in Fairfax County, Virginia. Brookmont is bordered to the east and north by Bethesda and to the northwest by Cabin John. The village of Glen Echo also borders the northern part of Brookmont.

According to the U.S. Census Bureau, the Brookmont CDP has a total area of 1.97 square miles (5.1 km^{2}), of which 1.31 square miles (3.4 km^{2}) are land and 0.66 square miles (1.7 km^{2}), or 33.59%, are water.

== Demographics ==
Historical population
Census	Pop.	Note	%±
2000	3,202		—
2010	3,468		8.3%
2020	3,751		8.2%
U.S. Decennial Census

=== Racial and ethnic composition ===
Brookmont CDP, Maryland – Racial and ethnic composition Note: the US Census treats Hispanic/Latino as an ethnic category. This table excludes Latinos from the racial categories and assigns them to a separate category. Hispanics/Latinos may be of any race.
Race / Ethnicity (NH = Non-Hispanic)	Pop 2000	Pop 2010	Pop 2020	% 2000	% 2010	% 2020
White alone (NH)	2,852	2,984	2,820	89.07%	86.04%	75.18%
Black or African American alone (NH)	49	66	101	1.53%	1.90%	2.69%
Native American or Alaska Native alone (NH)	6	4	0	0.19%	0.12%	0.00%
Asian alone (NH)	119	147	229	3.72%	4.24%	6.11%
Native Hawaiian or Pacific Islander alone (NH)	0	1	2	0.00%	0.03%	0.05%
Other race alone (NH)	10	4	39	0.31%	0.12%	1.04%
Mixed race or Multiracial (NH)	39	80	233	1.22%	2.31%	6.21%
Hispanic or Latino (any race)	127	182	327	3.97%	5.25%	8.72%
Total	3,202	3,468	3,751	100.00%	100.00%	100.00%

=== 2020 census ===
As of the 2020 census, Brookmont had a population of 3,751. The median age was 45.9 years. 25.3% of residents were under the age of 18 and 18.4% of residents were 65 years of age or older. For every 100 females there were 94.4 males, and for every 100 females age 18 and over there were 90.5 males age 18 and over.

100.0% of residents lived in urban areas, while 0.0% lived in rural areas.

There were 1,319 households in Brookmont, of which 38.7% had children under the age of 18 living in them. Of all households, 69.8% were married-couple households, 9.9% were households with a male householder and no spouse or partner present, and 17.5% were households with a female householder and no spouse or partner present. About 16.3% of all households were made up of individuals and 9.5% had someone living alone who was 65 years of age or older.

There were 1,372 housing units, of which 3.9% were vacant. The homeowner vacancy rate was 0.9% and the rental vacancy rate was 6.7%.

Racial composition as of the 2020 census
Race	Number	Percent
White	2,913	77.7%
Black or African American	105	2.8%
American Indian and Alaska Native	0	0.0%
Asian	230	6.1%
Native Hawaiian and Other Pacific Islander	3	0.1%
Some other race	71	1.9%
Two or more races	429	11.4%

=== 2000 census ===
As of the census of 2000, there were 3,202 people, 1,194 households, and 920 families residing in the area as defined by the Census Bureau. The population density was 2,361.7 inhabitants per square mile (911.9/km^{2}). There were 1,224 housing units at an average density of 902.8 per square mile (348.6/km^{2}). The racial makeup of the area was 92.35% White, 1.66% African American, 0.31% Native American, 3.72% Asian, 0.44% from other races, and 1.53% from two or more races. Hispanic or Latino of any race were 3.97% of the population.

There were 1,194 households, out of which 37.8% had children under the age of 18 living with them, 69.4% were married couples living together, 5.9% had a female householder with no husband present, and 22.9% were non-families. 16.5% of all households were made up of individuals, and 7.3% had someone living alone who was 65 years of age or older. The average household size was 2.68 and the average family size was 2.99.

In the area, the population was spread out, with 25.8% under the age of 18, 3.4% from 18 to 24, 23.4% from 25 to 44, 31.0% from 45 to 64, and 16.4% who were 65 years of age or older. The median age was 44 years. For every 100 females, there were 94.1 males. For every 100 females age 18 and over, there were 91.5 males.

The median income for a household in the area was $138,492, and the median income for a family was $150,000. Males had a median income of $94,066 versus $57,167 for females. The per capita income for the area was $66,465. About 0.9% of families and 1.7% of the population were below the poverty line, including none of those under the age of eighteen or sixty-five or over.

== See also ==
- Cabin John-Brookmont, a census-designated place delineated in 1980 and 1990
