= Morgan Park, Baltimore =

District in northeast Baltimore, Maryland, U.S.

Coordinates: 39°20′48″N 76°34′44″W

Morgan Park is a neighborhood in Baltimore, Maryland, located immediately east of Morgan State University.
