= Glen Echo, Maryland =

- Town
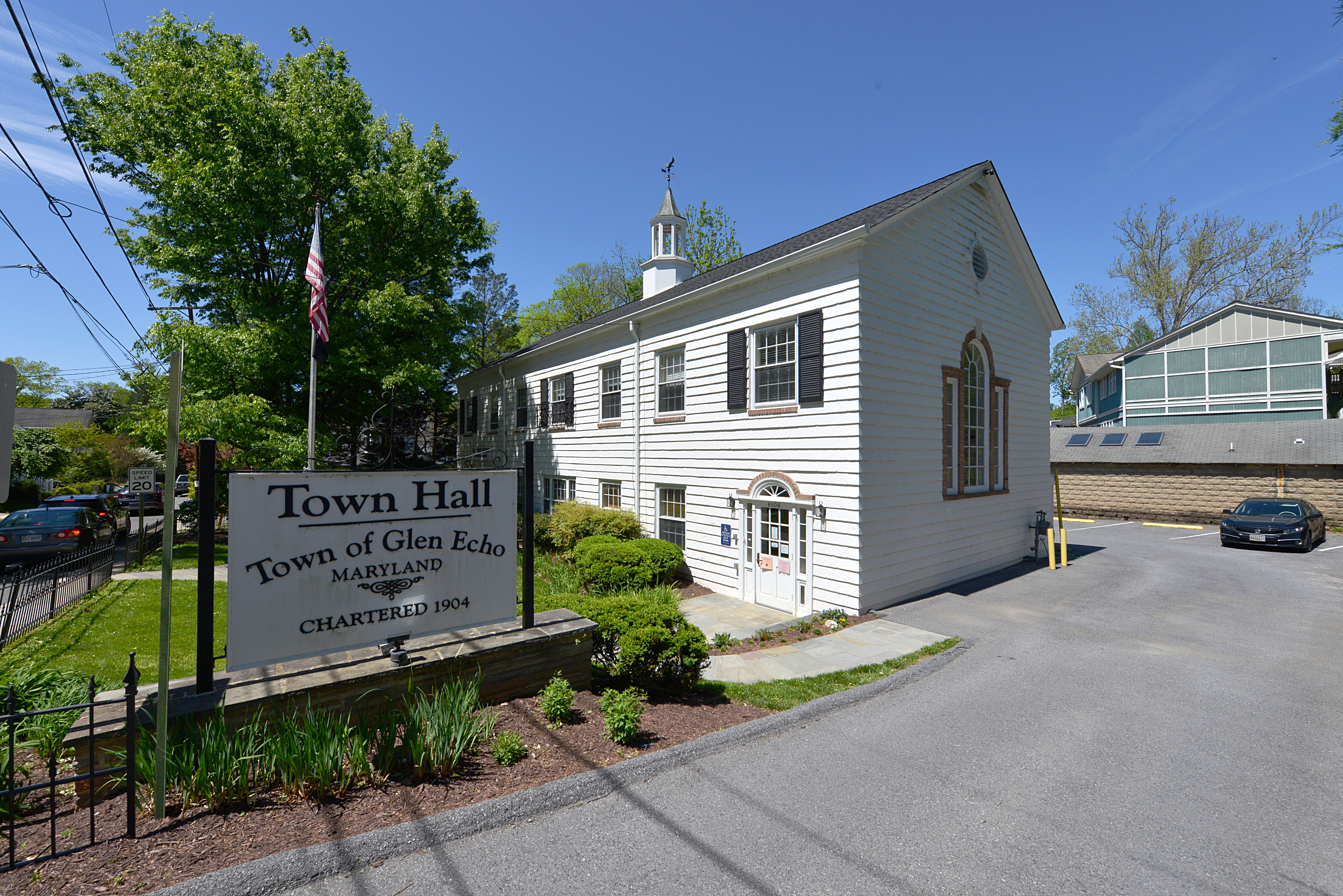

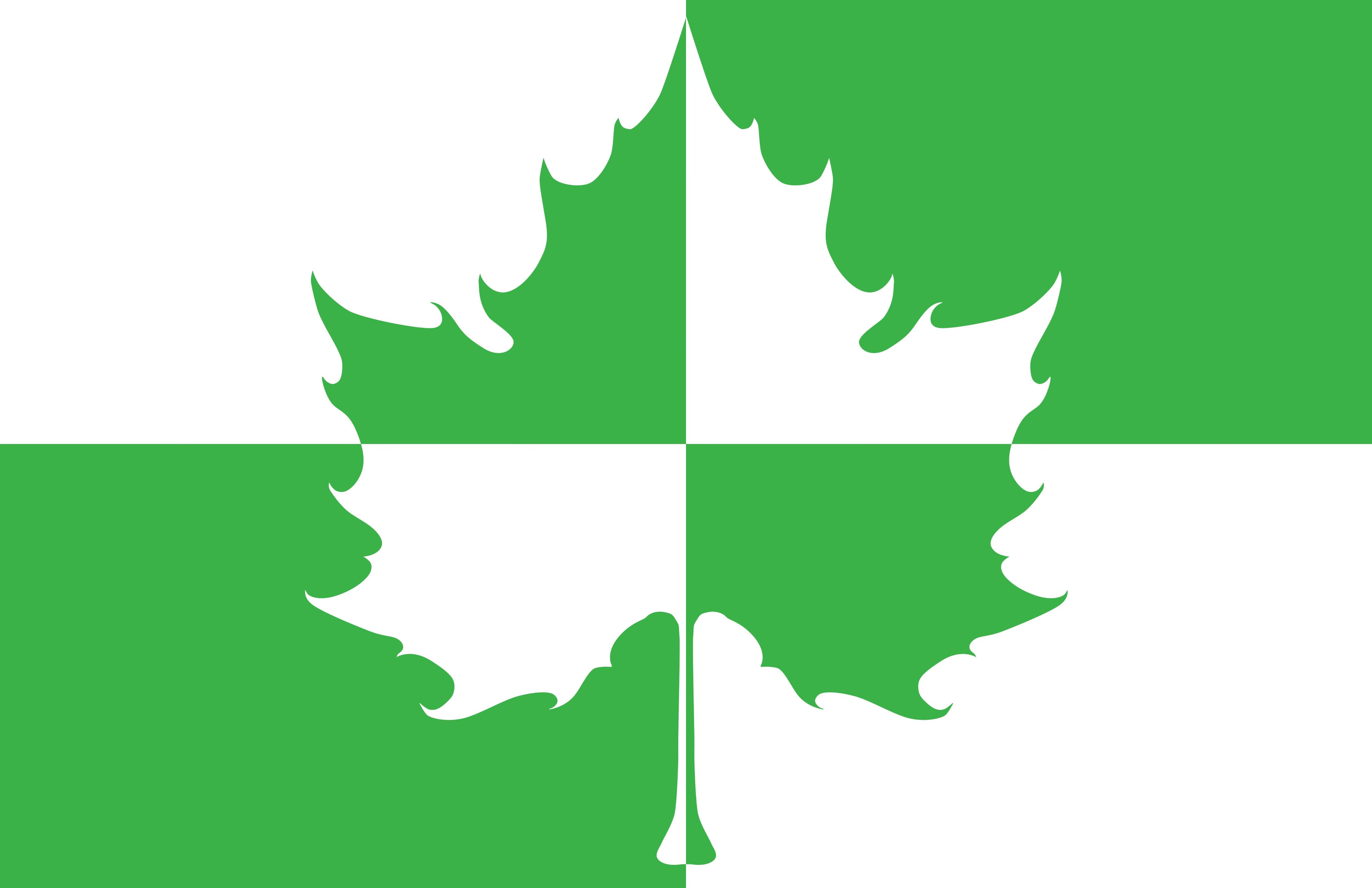
- Flag

- Location in Montgomery County and the state of Maryland
- Coordinates: 38°58′05″N 77°08′28″W
- Country: United States
- State: Maryland
- County: Montgomery
- Incorporated: 1904

Area
  - Total: 0.10 sq mi (0.27 km^{2})
  - Land: 0.10 sq mi (0.27 km^{2})
  - Water: 0 sq mi (0.00 km^{2})
- Elevation: 131 ft (40 m)

Population (2020)
  - Total: 279
  - Density: 2,721.7/sq mi (1,050.85/km^{2})
- Time zone: UTC-5 (Eastern (EST))
  - Summer (DST): UTC-4 (EDT)
- ZIP code: 20812
- Area codes: 301, 240
- FIPS code: 24-32900
- GNIS feature ID: 2390208
- Website: glenecho.gov

Glen Echo is a town in Montgomery County, Maryland, United States, that was chartered in 1904. The population was 279 at the 2020 census.

== History ==
Glen Echo derives its name from the name of the lots developed by Edward and Edwin Baltzley, father of Louis E. Baltzley, and an inventor, before the town was chartered, and who came up with the name c. 1888. Their promotional booklet for the land development was titled "Glen Echo on the Potomac: The Washington Rhine".

The town's development was fed by streetcar lines that connected the then-remote area to Washington, D.C.: first, the Glen Echo Railroad, and later the Washington Railway and Electric Company and its successor, the Capital Transit Company.

The town is known for its Chautauqua cultural events and for Glen Echo Park, a former amusement park that is now a U.S. national park.

Clara Barton, founder of the American Red Cross, lived in Glen Echo, a streetcar ride from her office, from 1897 until her death in 1912.

Before the passage of the 1968 Fair Housing Act, racial covenants were used in Glen Echo to exclude non-white people. For example, a 1940 covenant for a property owned by Robert McIntosh and Cushing Daniel says, "No persons of any race other than the white race shall use or occupy any building or any lot, except that this covenant shall not prevent occupancy by domestic servants of a different race domiciled with an owner or tenant."

In the 1980s, Glen Echo designated its town bird as the pileated woodpecker; insect, the spicebush swallowtail; tree, the eastern sycamore; and wildflower, the heartleaf aster.

== Geography ==
Glen Echo is located in southern Montgomery County overlooking the Potomac River. Its northeast border is MacArthur Boulevard, while its southwest border is the Chesapeake and Ohio Canal. It is bordered to the north by Bannockburn in Bethesda, to the east and south by Brookmont, and to the west by Cabin John.

The Clara Barton Parkway runs through the southwest side of the town, parallel to the C&O Canal. The parkway leads west 2 miles (3 km) to the Capital Beltway (I-495) and southeast 6 miles (10 km) to Georgetown in Washington, D.C.

According to the U.S. Census Bureau, Glen Echo has a total area of 0.10 square miles (0.26 km^{2}), all land.

== Demographics ==
Historical population
Census	Pop.	Note	%±
1910	203		—
1920	235		15.8%
1930	222		−5.5%
1940	395		77.9%
1950	356		−9.9%
1960	310		−12.9%
1970	297		−4.2%
1980	229		−22.9%
1990	234		2.2%
2000	242		3.4%
2010	255		5.4%
2020	279		9.4%
U.S. Decennial Census

=== 2010 census ===
As of the census of 2010, there were 255 people, 96 households, and 66 families living in the town. The population density was 2,550.0 inhabitants per square mile (984.6/km^{2}). There were 100 housing units at an average density of 1,000.0 per square mile (386.1/km^{2}). The racial makeup of the town was 92.5% White, 1.2% African American, 2.4% Asian, 1.6% from other races, and 2.4% from two or more races. Hispanic or Latino of any race were 3.9% of the population.

There were 96 households, of which 39.6% had children under the age of 18 living with them, 64.6% were married couples living together, 3.1% had a female householder with no husband present, 1.0% had a male householder with no wife present, and 31.3% were non-families. 26.0% of all households were made up of individuals, and 14.6% had someone living alone who was 65 years of age or older. The average household size was 2.66 and the average family size was 3.27.

The median age in the town was 42.4 years. 27.5% of residents were under the age of 18; 4.3% were between the ages of 18 and 24; 23.8% were from 25 to 44; 31.4% were from 45 to 64; and 12.9% were 65 years of age or older. The gender makeup of the town was 47.8% male and 52.2% female.

=== 2000 census ===
As of the census of 2000, there were 242 people, 91 households, and 63 families living in the town. The population density was 2,217.8 inhabitants per square mile (856.3/km^{2}). There were 93 housing units at an average density of 852.3 per square mile (329.1/km^{2}). The racial makeup of the town was 95.87% White, 2.48% African American, 1.24% Asian, 0.41% from other races. Hispanic or Latino of any race were 1.65% of the population.

There were 91 households, out of which 39.6% had children under the age of 18 living with them, 63.7% were married couples living together, 5.5% had a female householder with no husband present, and 29.7% were non-families. 15.4% of all households were made up of individuals, and 6.6% had someone living alone who was 65 years of age or older. The average household size was 2.66 and the average family size was 3.00.

In the town, the population was spread out, with 24.8% under the age of 18, 2.9% from 18 to 24, 32.6% from 25 to 44, 32.2% from 45 to 64, and 7.4% who were 65 years of age or older. The median age was 39 years. For every 100 females, there were 108.6 males. For every 100 females age 18 and over, there were 93.6 males.

The median income for a household in the town was $122,409, and the median income for a family was $134,741. Males had a median income of $64,375 versus $76,784 for females. The per capita income for the town was $56,728. None of the families and 1.7% of the population were living below the poverty line.

== Education ==
Glen Echo is served by Montgomery County Public Schools.

Schools that serve Glen Echo include:

- Bannockburn Elementary School
- Thomas W. Pyle Middle School
- Walt Whitman High School

== Transportation ==
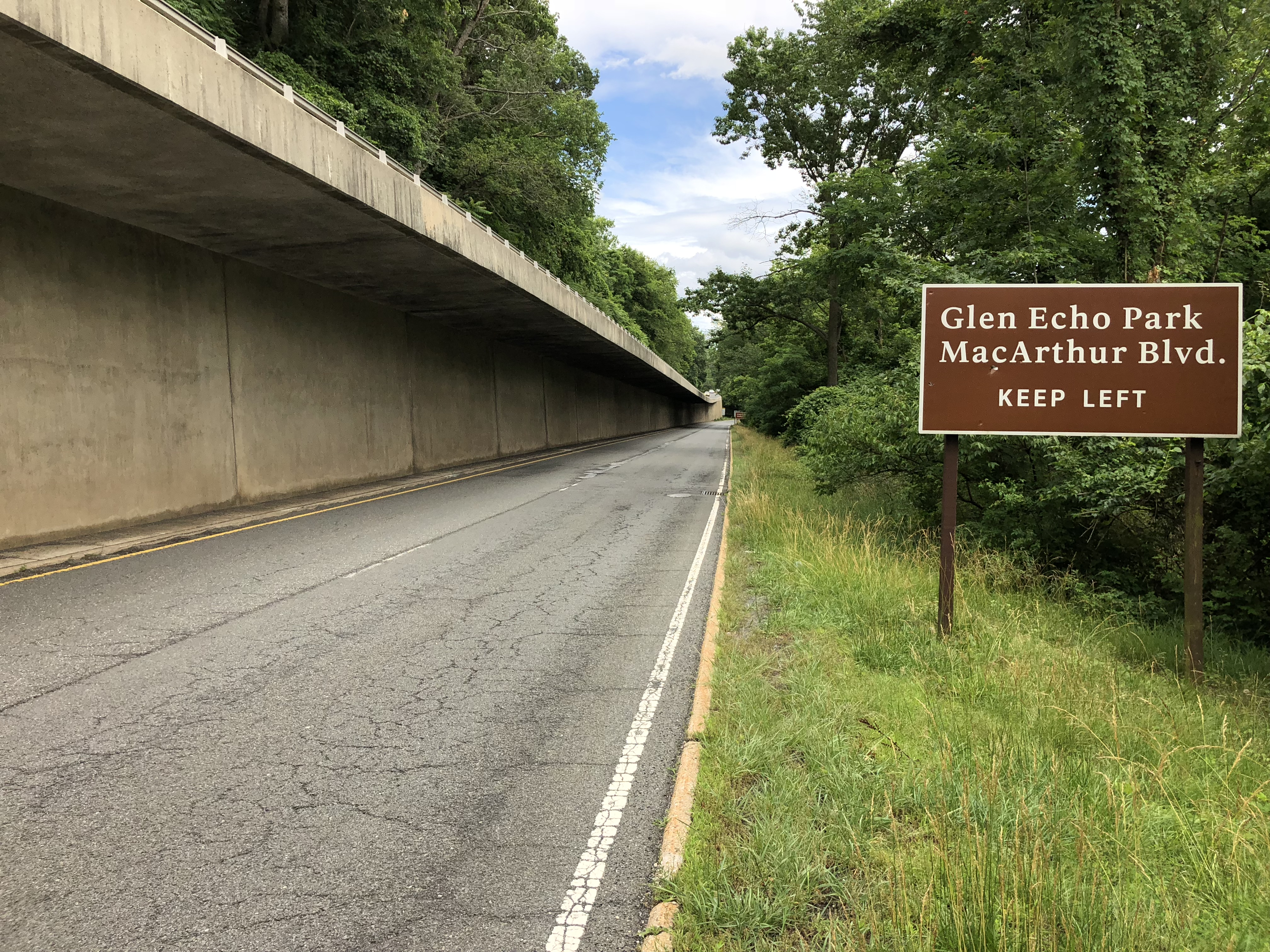
Clara Barton Parkway southeastbound in Glen Echo, approaching the MacArthur Boulevard interchange

The most prominent roads serving Glen Echo directly are the Clara Barton Parkway and its spur, the Cabin John Parkway, which intersect at the west end of the town. Access to the residential and commercial properties in the town is via an interchange with MacArthur Boulevard just southeast of the town limits. MacArthur Boulevard intersects with most streets within the town, though it is not actually within the town limits. Maryland Route 188 and Maryland Route 614 also end at MacArthur Boulevard just beyond the town limits.

== Notable people ==
- Carol J. Barton (born 1954), noted book artist and painter; runs the Glen Echo Mini Farm Stand
- Clara Barton (1821–1912), founder of the American Red Cross, moved to, retired at, and died in Glen Echo
- Roger Tory Peterson (1908–1996), naturalist, ornithologist, artist, educator, and pioneering conservationist. With his wife, Peterson moved to Glen Echo in 1945 after his military service.
- Carolyn Reeder (1937–2012), children's author and winner of the Scott O'Dell Award for Historical Fiction

== See also ==
- Glen Echo Park (Maryland)
