= Great Falls Tavern =

Historic building in Maryland, US

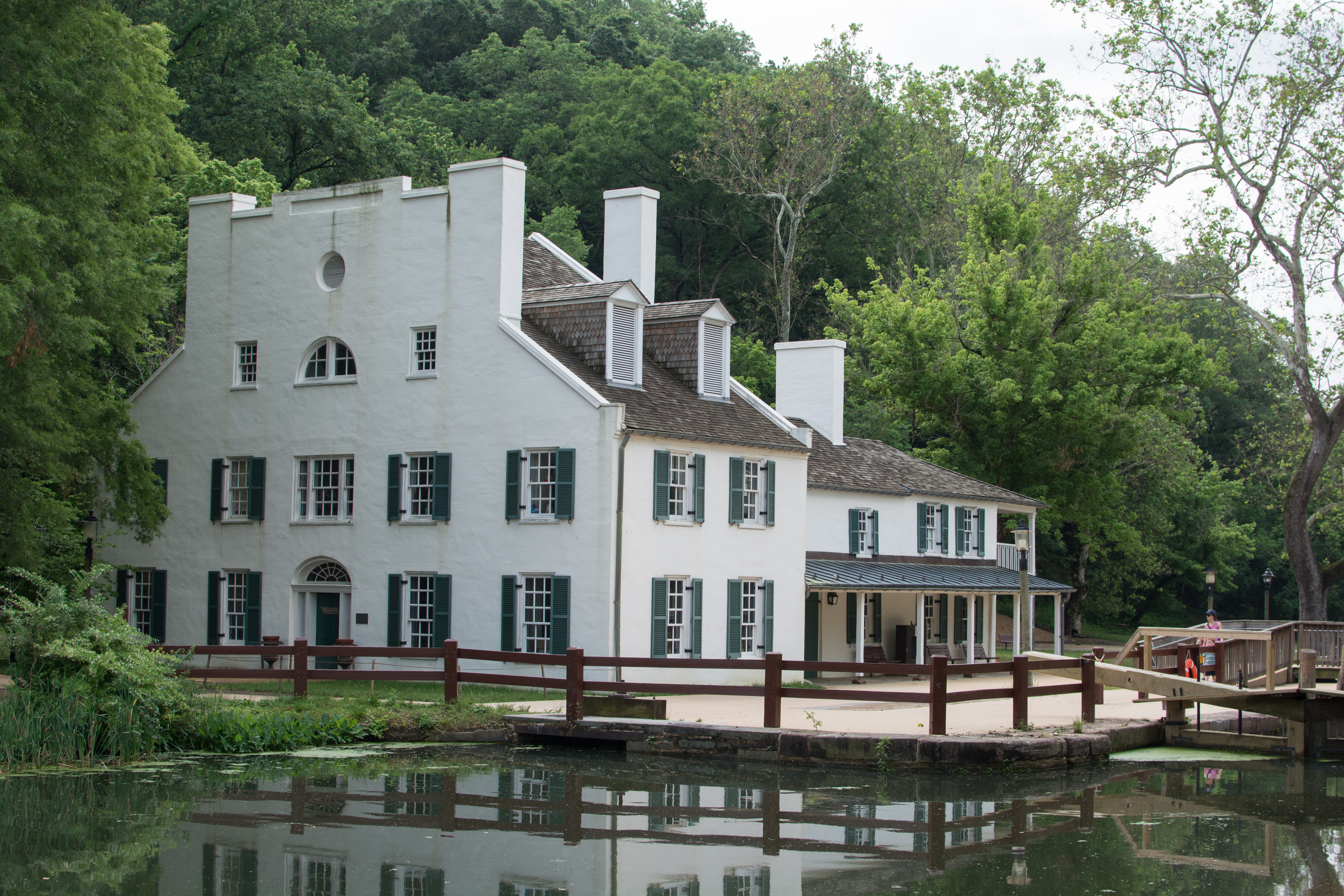
Great Falls Tavern in 2013.

Great Falls Tavern (known at various times as Great Falls Hotel and Crommelin House) is a historic building in Montgomery County, Maryland, in the United States. Located at mile 14.3 along the Chesapeake and Ohio Canal towpath, it is today used by the National Park Service as one of its five visitor centers in the Chesapeake and Ohio Canal National Historical Park.

The building was erected between 1828 and 1831 as a house for the lockkeeper W. W. Fenlon, who supervised all six locks close to Great Falls, and a lodging place for travelers. Its original name was the Crommelin House after a Dutch investor in the canal. "It quickly became the nucleus of the local community, a vibrant gathering place for holidays or rendezvous with friends. Nearly twenty years later, the Canal Company prohibited the sale of alcohol at the tavern, and a year later, in 1849, ruled that the building should serve only as a lockhouse, actions probably intended to tone down its role as a social gathering place. In 1851 the north wing "Ball Room" became a grocery store, and in 1858 lockkeeper Henry Busey was permitted to re-open an ordinary (inn), to lodge guests," Gail Spilsbury wrote in 2010.
