= Drummond, Maryland =

- Special taxing district and village
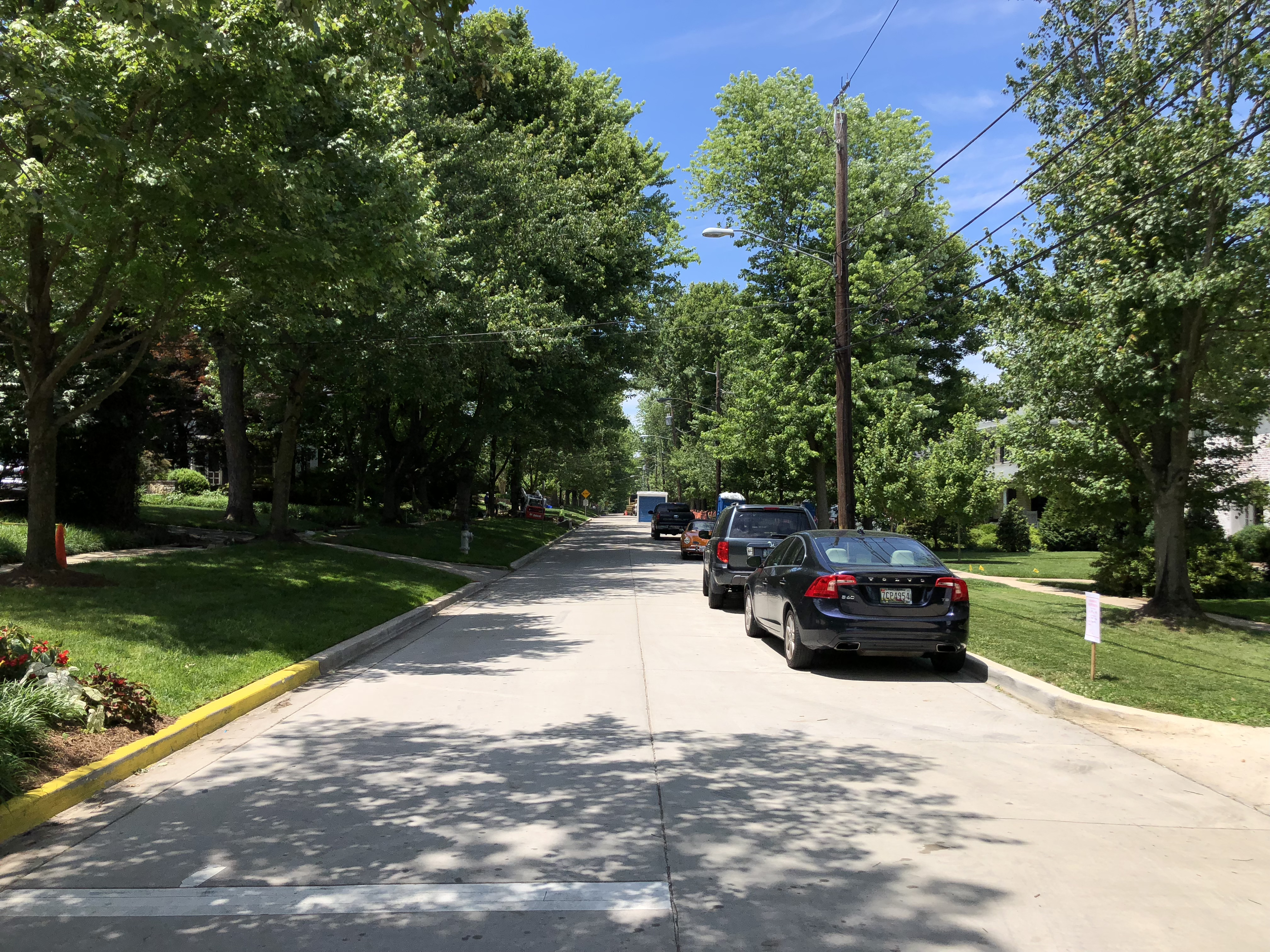
- Drummond Avenue in Drummond

- Location within the state of Maryland Drummond (the United States)
- Coordinates: 39°5′19″N 77°4′49″W
- Country: United States of America
- State: Maryland
- County: Montgomery

Government
  - Type: Citizen's Committee
- Elevation: 315 ft (96 m)

Population (1990)
  - Total: 120
- Time zone: UTC-5 (Eastern (EST))
  - Summer (DST): UTC-4 (EDT)
- ZIP codes: 20815
- Area codes: 301, 240
- Website: drummondmd.gov

Drummond is a village and special taxing district in Montgomery County, Maryland, United States.

Founded in 1903 and chartered in 1916, the village contains the area along about one-third of Drummond Avenue between Wisconsin Avenue and Little Falls Stream Valley Park.

The population was 120 as of 1990. There are 41 homes in the village.

The village is governed by a three-member Citizens' Committee.
