= National Register of Historic Places listings in Montgomery County, Maryland =

Location of Montgomery County in Maryland

This is a list of the National Register of Historic Places listings in Montgomery County, Maryland.

This is intended to be a complete list of the properties and districts on the National Register of Historic Places in Montgomery County, Maryland, United States. Latitude and longitude coordinates are provided for many National Register properties and districts; these locations may be seen together in a map.

There are 83 properties and districts listed on the National Register in the county, including 4 National Historic Landmarks.

Contents: Counties in Maryland
Allegany - Anne Arundel - Baltimore (city) - Baltimore County - Calvert - Caroline - Carroll - Cecil - Charles - Dorchester - Frederick - Garrett - Harford - Howard - Kent - Montgomery - Prince George's - Queen Anne's - Somerset - St. Mary's - Talbot - Washington - Wicomico - Worcester

This National Park Service list is complete through NPS recent listings posted April 24, 2026.

== Current listings ==
	Name on the Register	Image	Date listed	Location	City or town	Description
1	Annington	Annington	December 11, 1978 (#78001474)	24001 White's Ferry Road; 39°10′06″N 77°30′08″W	Poolesville	1813 Georgian dwelling constructed of brick in Flemish bond consisting of three two-story sections: a main block three bays wide, a wing to the west two bays wide, and a wing to the east three bays wide.
2	Edward Beale House	Edward Beale House	August 16, 1996 (#96000902)	11011 Glen Rd. 39°02′59″N 77°13′31″W	Potomac	Colonial Revival residence built in 1938, and designed to look like a Pennsylvania farmhouse.
3	Beall-Dawson House	Beall-Dawson House	March 30, 1973 (#73000933)	103 W. Montgomery Ave. 39°05′03″N 77°09′19″W	Rockville	1815 Federal-style house built by Upton Beale, an early clerk of the Montgomery County Court
4	J. A. Belt Building	J. A. Belt Building	August 9, 1984 (#84001845)	227 E. Diamond Ave. 39°08′32″N 77°11′39″W	Gaithersburg	1903 two-story rectangular brick building that was built on the foundations of a late-19th-century commercial structure of similar design.
5	Bethesda Meetinghouse	Bethesda Meetinghouse	April 18, 1977 (#77000699)	9400 Wisconsin Ave. 39°00′35″N 77°05′54″W	Bethesda	1850 Greek Revival church that gave the surrounding area its name
6	Bethesda Naval Hospital Tower	Bethesda Naval Hospital Tower	March 8, 1977 (#77000700)	8901 Wisconsin Ave. 39°00′06″N 77°05′41″W	Bethesda	
7	Bethesda Theatre	Bethesda Theatre	February 5, 1999 (#99000133)	7719 Wisconsin Ave. 38°59′14″N 77°05′41″W	Bethesda	1938 John Eberson movie theater in near-original condition, still in use
8	Bingham-Brewer House	Bingham-Brewer House	November 24, 1980 (#80001828)	307 Great Falls Rd. 39°04′53″N 77°09′39″W	Rockville	Two-story brick house, with a Flemish Bond front facade, dating to 1821. Also on the property is a late-19th-century smokehouse, privy, and a late-19th- or early-20th-century chicken house.
9	Brookeville Historic District	Brookeville Historic District	October 11, 1979 (#79003272)	Maryland Route 97; 39°10′52″N 77°03′35″W	Brookeville	The majority of the structures were built before 1900, and range in style from the Federal-style Jordan House to the simple, vernacular cabin known as the Blue House. The houses are built of stone, brick, and frame, and cover a period from 1779 to the 1950s.
10	Brookeville Woolen Mill and House	Brookeville Woolen Mill and House	September 6, 1978 (#78001472)	1901 Brighton Dam Rd. 39°11′51″N 77°02′53″W	Brookeville	Complex consists of two buildings constructed of rubble masonry. The woolen mill is a small one-story structure. South of the mill are two stone worker's houses, one of which is a three-bay by two-bay, 1 1/2-story stone house. The house was most likely constructed prior to 1783.
11	Cabin John Aqueduct	Cabin John Aqueduct	February 28, 1973 (#73000932)	MacArthur Boulevard over Cabin John Creek and Cabin John Parkway; 38°58′21″N 77°08′56″W	Glen Echo	Also called Union Arch Bridge. Masonry bridge completed in 1864 as part of the Washington Aqueduct.
12	Carderock Springs Historic District	Carderock Springs Historic District	November 21, 2008 (#08001074)	Roughly bounded by Interstate 495, Cabin John Regional Park, Seven Locks Rd., Fenway Rd., and Persimmon Tree Ln. 38°59′20″N 77°10′03″W	Bethesda	275 modernist style suburban homes built from 1962 to 1966
13	Carousel at Glen Echo Park	Carousel at Glen Echo Park	July 4, 1980 (#80000351)	MacArthur Boulevard; 38°57′57″N 77°08′19″W	Glen Echo	1921 Dentzel carousel
14	Rachel Carson House	Rachel Carson House	December 4, 1991 (#91002058)	11701 Berwick Rd. 39°02′48″N 77°00′02″W	Silver Spring	Ranch-style house where Rachel Carson wrote her famous book Silent Spring in 1958
15	Chautauqua Tower	Chautauqua Tower	July 4, 1980 (#80000350)	Glen Echo Park; MacArthur Boulevard; 38°57′58″N 77°08′18″W	Glen Echo	1892 stone tower in Richardsonian Romanesque style
16	Chesapeake and Ohio Canal National Historical Park	Chesapeake and Ohio Canal National Historical Park	October 15, 1966 (#66000036)	Bordering the Potomac River from Georgetown, D.C. to Cumberland, Maryland; 38°53′59″N 77°03′28″W	Poolesville, Potomac, Seneca	Canal constructed from 1828 to 1850. Follows the Potomac River from Georgetown, Washington, D.C. to Cumberland, Maryland
17	Chiswell's Inheritance	Chiswell's Inheritance	September 10, 1974 (#74000960)	18200 Beallsville Road Maryland Route 109; 39°09′11″N 77°25′24″W	Poolesville	Late-18th-century plantation house
18	Clara Barton National Historic Site	Clara Barton National Historic Site	October 15, 1966 (#66000037)	5801 Oxford Rd. 38°58′01″N 77°08′27″W	Glen Echo	Home of Clara Barton, founder of the American Red Cross
19	Clarksburg School	Clarksburg School	February 20, 1975 (#75000909)	13530 Redgrave Place; 39°14′14″N 77°16′52″W	Clarksburg	Frame structure built in 1909, served as the local public school from 1909 to 1972
20	Clifton	Clifton	June 25, 1974 (#74000959)	17107 New Hampshire Ave. 39°08′17″N 76°59′39″W	Ednor	Mid-18th-century brick home closely affiliated with the early Quaker community of Sandy Spring
21	Clover Hill	Clover Hill	July 20, 1982 (#82002817)	21310 Zion Rd. 39°12′26″N 77°05′41″W	Brookeville	Primary Italianate home built around 1857, though has surrounding buildings which date to the mid 1st century
22	Darnall Place	Darnall Place	August 13, 1979 (#79001140)	East of Poolesville at 17615 White's Ferry Rd. 39°07′33″N 77°22′04″W	Poolesville	Farm complex consists of four small 18th-century stone buildings, a 19th-century frame wagon shed/corn crib, a 20th-century concrete block barn, and three late-19th- or early-20th-century frame sheds
23	Davis-Warner House	Davis-Warner House	December 7, 2001 (#01001335)	8114 Carroll Ave. 38°59′26″N 76°59′38″W	Takoma Park	Large, 3-story frame Stick Style residence constructed around 1875
24	Dawson Farm	Dawson Farm	January 11, 1985 (#85000060)	1070 and 1080 Copperstone Ct. 39°04′28″N 77°08′33″W	Rockville	Contains an 1874 2 1/2-story frame dwelling and a large 2 1/2-story hip-roofed frame house dating to 1912
25	Dowden's Luck	Dowden's Luck	November 10, 1988 (#88002143)	18511 Beallsvile Rd. 39°09′35″N 77°24′58″W	Poolesville	The main house is a 2 1/2-story, late Federal-style frame house with additions made in 1855 and 1910. Also on the property are a one-story gable-roofed stone slave quarters, a one-story gable-roofed brick smokehouse, a stone spring house, and the foundations of two barns, all built during the 1824–1850 plantation period.
26	Drury-Austin House	Drury-Austin House	March 13, 1986 (#86000371)	16112 Barnesville Rd. 39°12′03″N 77°20′21″W	Boyds	A late-18th-century one-room plan log house with an early-19th-century timber frame addition
27	East Oaks	East Oaks	October 18, 1996 (#96001168)	21524 White's Ferry Road (MD 107); 39°09′13″N 77°27′03″W	Poolesville	Consists of a 2 1/2-story, ca. 1829 Federal-period brick residence brick smokehouse, sandstone slave quarter, stone bank barn, stone dairy, and log and frame tenant house.
28	Friends Advice	Friends Advice	October 28, 1992 (#92001383)	19001 Bucklodge Rd. 39°09′58″N 77°21′31″W	Boyds	The earliest portion, the ca. 1806 Federal style block, sits on a stone foundation with a gable roof and gabled dormers. Later additions include a Federal style block of the first quarter of the 19th century, a frame block constructed in 1882 on the foundation of an 18th-century log structure, and a Colonial Revival-style block constructed in 1939–1940.
29	Frieda Fromm-Reichmann Cottage	Frieda Fromm-Reichmann Cottage	January 13, 2021 (#100006277)	19 Thomas Street; 39°04′59″N 77°09′44″W	Rockville	
30	Gaithersburg B & O Railroad Station and Freight Shed	Gaithersburg B & O Railroad Station and Freight Shed	October 5, 1978 (#78001473)	Summit and E. Diamond Aves. 39°08′28″N 77°11′57″W	Gaithersburg	1881 train station with a loading dock and freight shed
31	Gaithersburg Latitude Observatory	Gaithersburg Latitude Observatory	July 12, 1985 (#85001578)	100 DeSellum Ave; 39°08′12″N 77°11′57″W	Gaithersburg	Small 1899 frame observatory which was one of 5 other observatories across the world that took part in the International Polar Motion Service of 1899.
32	Garrett Park Historic District	Garrett Park Historic District	January 31, 1975 (#75000910)	Roughly bounded by B&O railroad tracks, Rock Creek Park, and Flanders Ave. 39°02′09″N 77°05′41″W	Garrett Park	Victorian railroad suburb, contains houses dating from the 1880s to the 1920s. Architectural styles include those of the Late Victorian period.
33	George Washington Memorial Parkway	George Washington Memorial Parkway	June 2, 1995 (#95000605)	Roughly from American Legion to the Memorial Bridge on the southern side of the Potomac River, and from Brickyard Rd. to the Chain Bridge on the northern side 38°56′19″N 77°08′07″W	Cabin John	Portion of parkway on the northern side is referred to as the Clara Barton Parkway
34	Glen Echo Park Historic District	Glen Echo Park Historic District	June 8, 1984 (#84001850)	MacArthur Boulevard; 38°57′57″N 77°08′37″W	Glen Echo	Former Chautauqua Assembly site (1891) and amusement park
35	Glenview Farm	Glenview Farm	October 10, 2007 (#07001073)	603 Edmonston Dr. 39°05′11″N 77°07′45″W	Rockville	Current Neo-Classical Revival mansion built in 1926 around the remnants of a smaller house dating to 1838.
36	Hammond Wood Historic District	Hammond Wood Historic District	December 15, 2004 (#04001355)	Veirs Mill Rd., Highview Ave., Pendleton Dr., College View Dr., Woodridge Ave. 39°02′51″N 77°04′08″W	Silver Spring	58 Contemporary suburban houses built from 1949 to 1951.
37	Hanover Farm House	Hanover Farm House	August 6, 1980 (#80001823)	19501 Darnestown Rd. 39°10′40″N 77°24′09″W	Beallsville	Brick house consists of a Federal main block and kitchen wing dating to 1801–1804, and a 1 1/2-story modern kitchen wing added in 1954
38	Johnson-Wolfe Farm	Johnson-Wolfe Farm	November 8, 2003 (#03001114)	23900 Old Hundred Rd. 39°14′50″N 77°21′01″W	Comus	Complex includes an 1862 vernacular dwelling known as the Comus Inn, smokehouse, barn, and a poultry house built in 1936
39	Kensington Historic District	Kensington Historic District	September 4, 1980 (#80001827)	Roughly bounded by railroad tracks, the Kensington Parkway, Summit Ave., and Washington and Warner Sts. 39°01′29″N 77°04′33″W	Kensington	Late Victorian suburban railroad community that is relatively untouched by 20th-century suburban development
40	Seymour Krieger House	Seymour Krieger House	October 29, 2008 (#08001022)	6739 Brigadoon Dr. 38°58′38″N 77°08′10″W	Bethesda	International 1-story house built by architect Marcel Breuer in 1958
41	Layton House	Layton House	September 25, 1975 (#75000911)	Southwestern corner of Maryland Routes 108 and 420; 39°12′42″N 77°08′35″W	Laytonsville	1835 2-story brick Federal-style house with a three-bay Flemish bond main (north) facade and a gable roof.
42	Mihran Mesrobian House	Mihran Mesrobian House	November 13, 2017 (#100001794)	7410 Connecticut Ave. 38°59′04″N 77°04′38″W	Chevy Chase	
43	Milimar	Milimar	April 13, 1973 (#73000935)	410 Randolph Rd. 39°04′03″N 77°01′07″W	Silver Spring	Georgian 2 1/2-story brick house built in 1790
44	Milton	Milton	September 25, 1975 (#75000908)	5312 Allandale Rd. 38°57′35″N 77°06′11″W	Bethesda	Older section constructed prior to 1820 is one and one-half stories and a two-story three-bay structure was subsequently built in 1847. Outbuildings on the property include a square, stone smokehouse with a square, hipped roof, and a 19th-century stone ice house.
45	Montgomery County Courthouse Historic District	Montgomery County Courthouse Historic District	September 2, 1986 (#86003352)	Courthouse Sq. and S. Washington St. 39°04′59″N 77°09′09″W	Rockville	Contains 1891 Romanesque Revival courthouse, 1931 Neoclassical courthouse, 1931 Art Deco bank, and 1938 post office
46	Montrose Schoolhouse	Montrose Schoolhouse	January 24, 1983 (#83002956)	5721 Randolph Road; 39°03′12″N 77°06′54″W	Rockville	1909 schoolhouse is the last surviving building of the 19th-century Montrose Crossroads community
47	Moreland	Moreland	August 11, 2005 (#05000877)	7810 Moorland Ln. 38°59′16″N 77°06′39″W	Bethesda	2 1/2-story early Colonial Revival frame dwelling that was constructed around 1894.
48	Mt. Nebo	Mt. Nebo	March 28, 1985 (#85000653)	14510 Mt. Nebo Rd. 39°05′35″N 77°26′55″W	Poolesville	Large 2 1/2-story gable-roofed frame dwelling constructed in three periods; the main block dates to the second quarter of the 19th century. Also on the property is a mid-19th-century log smokehouse and the remains of an early terraced "waterfall" garden.
49	NIST Historic District	NIST Historic District	August 5, 2021 (#100006800)	100 Bureau Dr. 39°08′28″N 77°13′05″W	Gaithersburg	
50	National Park Seminary Historic District	National Park Seminary Historic District	September 14, 1972 (#72000586)	Linden Lane near Interstate 495; 39°00′43″N 77°03′21″W	Forest Glen Park	Victorian girls finishing school which was previously a resort for DC residents
51	Naval Ordnance Laboratory	Naval Ordnance Laboratory	June 9, 2025 (#100011915)	10901 New Hampshire Avenue; 39°02′06″N 76°59′02″W	Silver Spring	Now the FDA campus.
52	New Mark Commons	New Mark Commons	August 1, 2017 (#16000869)	Bounded by Maryland Ave., Argyle & Monroe Sts., Tower Oaks, I 270, 39°04′33″N 77°09′34″W	Rockville	
53	Oaks II	Oaks II	November 30, 1982 (#82001598)	5815 Riggs Rd. 39°11′50″N 77°07′24″W	Laytonsville	Built between 1797 and 1814, it is a 1 1/2-story gambrel-roofed log house with an adjoining one-story gable-roofed log addition.
54	Old Chiswell Place	Old Chiswell Place	September 9, 1975 (#75000912)	East of Poolesville on Cattail Rd. 39°09′01″N 77°23′18″W	Poolesville	1790 home is a frame, log, and brick structure built in three stages. In addition to the residence, there is a meathouse of log with an attached springhouse. There is a small log house probably used for storage with sandstone chips used between the logs. There is also an early corncrib made of frame and logs.
55	Polychrome Historic District	Polychrome Historic District	August 29, 1996 (#96000900)	9900 and 9904 Colesville Rd., 9919, 9923, and 9925 Sutherland Rd. 39°01′05″N 77°00′57″W	Silver Spring	Group of five affordable small houses built by John Joseph Early in 1934 and 1935 with polychrome and art deco styling
56	Nathan Dickerson Poole House	Nathan Dickerson Poole House	January 24, 1983 (#83002957)	15600 Edwards Ferry Rd. 39°06′43″N 77°27′56″W	Poolesville	2 1/2-story frame dwelling constructed in 1871. Its design combines elements of the Victorian Gothic and Italianate styles. Also on the property are a frame barn and corn shed dating to the early 20th century.
57	Poolesville Historic District	Poolesville Historic District	May 29, 1975 (#75000913)	Area around the junctions of Maryland Route 107, Maryland Route 109, and Willard Rd. 39°08′50″N 77°24′53″W	Poolesville	Contains 33 buildings that date from the late 18th century to the early 20th century. Most of the buildings consist of farmhouses and outbuildings.
58	The Ridge	The Ridge	April 5, 1988 (#88000267)	19000 Muncaster Rd. 39°10′03″N 77°07′08″W	Derwood	One-and-one-half-story mid-18th-century Flemish bond brick house on a fieldstone foundation. The decorative detailing in the main house reflects Georgian, Federal, and Greek Revival influences. Also on the property is an 18th-century two-story log building.
59	Riley-Bolten House	Riley-Bolten House	December 30, 2011 (#11000961)	11420 Old Georgetown Rd. 39°02′38″N 77°07′17″W	North Bethesda	
60	River Road Unitarian Church	River Road Unitarian Church	January 22, 2025 (#100011323)	6301 River Road; 38°58′36″N 77°07′36″W	Bethesda	
61	Rock Creek Woods Historic District	Rock Creek Woods Historic District	December 15, 2004 (#04001354)	11504 and 11506 Connecticut Ave., 3600-3702 Spruell Dr., 3908-4020 Rickover Rd., and 4004-4019 Ingersol Dr. 39°02′45″N 77°04′43″W	Silver Spring	Suburban development consisting of 74 Contemporary houses
62	Rockville Park Historic District	Rockville Park Historic District	December 30, 2011 (#11000962)	Roughly bounded by Baltimore Rd., Joseph St., Grandin, Reading, & S. Stonestreet Aves. 39°04′55″N 77°08′23″W	Rockville	
63	Rockville Railroad Station	Rockville Railroad Station	July 18, 1974 (#74000961)	98 Church St. 39°04′58″N 77°08′42″W	Rockville	1873 Queen Anne style railroad station built for the B&O Railroad's Metropolitan Branch
64	Salmon-Stohlman House	Salmon-Stohlman House	April 11, 2002 (#02000353)	4728 Dorset Ave. 38°58′04″N 77°05′46″W	Chevy Chase	2 1/2-story frame structure built around 1893. Designed in a transitional manner with late Victorian detailing. It was one of the first houses built in the present day Town of Somerset.
65	Sandy Spring Friends Meetinghouse	Sandy Spring Friends Meetinghouse	September 22, 1972 (#72000587)	17715 Meeting House Road; 39°08′50″N 77°01′31″W	Sandy Spring	Large, Flemish bond brick, Federal-style Quaker Meeting House built in 1817.
66	Seneca Historic District	Seneca Historic District	November 15, 1978 (#78001475)	Southeast of Poolesville; 39°05′28″N 77°20′48″W	Poolesville	Comprises 3,850 acres (15.6 km^{2}) of federal, state, and county parkland and farmland in which 15 historic houses are situated. The C&O Canal, including Riley's Lock House (Lock House #24), and the Seneca Sandstone Quarry and its associated buildings also stand within the district. The 15 historic houses are surrounded by dependencies of various periods, in most cases dating from the period of the dwelling. There are slave quarters, smokehouses, springhouses, corn cribs, and tobacco barns.
67	Seneca Quarry	Seneca Quarry	April 24, 1973 (#73000224)	Tschiffeley Mill Rd. 39°04′08″N 77°20′45″W	Seneca	Quarry used from 1780 to 1900. The property includes ruins of cutting and duplex buildings.
68	Silver Spring Baltimore and Ohio Railroad Station	Silver Spring Baltimore and Ohio Railroad Station	August 31, 2000 (#00001035)	8100 Georgia Ave. 38°59′24″N 77°01′37″W	Silver Spring	The current Colonial Revival structure replaced an earlier 1878 Victorian style station in 1940.
69	Susanna Farm	Susanna Farm	January 27, 1983 (#83002958)	17700 White Grounds Rd. 39°08′23″N 77°20′42″W	Dawsonville	An L-shaped, 2 1/2-story 19th-century frame farmhouse. Last renovated in an Italianate style in 1877-78. Five outbuildings stand on the property, including a stone kitchen/slave quarters and meat house which are believed to be contemporary with the house, an 1870s frame bank barn, and 20th-century farm buildings
70	Takoma Avenue Historic District	Takoma Avenue Historic District	December 15, 2004 (#04001353)	7906, 7908, 7910, 7912, 7914 Takoma Ave. 38°59′18″N 77°01′05″W	Takoma Park	5 houses designed by Charles M. Goodman in 1951.
71	Takoma Park Historic District	Takoma Park Historic District	July 16, 1976 (#76001008)	Roughly bounded by D.C., Silver Spring, and east to the junction of Woodland and Elm Aves. 38°58′41″N 77°00′46″W	Silver Spring and Takoma Park	Originally platted in 1883 as a railroad suburb, the opening of streetcar lines led to the expansion of the district in the early 20th century. Takoma Park houses built between 1883 and 1900 are fanciful Queen Anne architecture. Buildings developed after the turn of the 20th century tend to be 1- to 2-story brick structures with simple ornamentation, although a few display characteristics of Art Deco or Tudor Revival.
72	David W. Taylor Model Basin	David W. Taylor Model Basin	October 17, 1985 (#85003231)	Bounded by MacArthur Boulevard and George Washington Memorial Parkway; 38°58′27″N 77°11′22″W	Bethesda	One of the largest ship building basins in the world, constructed in 1938
73	Third Addition to Rockville and Old St. Mary's Church and Cemetery	Third Addition to Rockville and Old St. Mary's Church and Cemetery	November 20, 1978 (#78001476)	Veirs Mill and Old Baltimore Rds. 39°04′56″N 77°08′44″W	Rockville	Contains St. Mary's Church and its adjacent cemetery, both built and founded in 1817 and the Wire Hardware Store, built in 1895. St. Mary's is Montgomery County's oldest brick Catholic church and the hardware store is Rockville's last cast iron frame commercial structure.
74	Thomas and Company Cannery	Thomas and Company Cannery	July 5, 1990 (#90001025)	Junction of E. Diamond and N. Frederick Aves. 39°08′31″N 77°12′07″W	Gaithersburg	One to two-story tall, free-standing, load-bearing brick rectangular structure composed of four discrete, structurally independent but contiguous elements, built between 1917 and 1918. An addition was constructed in 1956.
75	U.S. Atomic Energy Commission	U.S. Atomic Energy Commission	May 23, 2016 (#16000275)	19901 Germantown Rd. 39°10′50″N 77°15′23″W	Germantown	Office complex of AEC in Germantown; now a DoE facility
76	Valhalla	Valhalla	March 15, 1982 (#82002818)	19010 White's Ferry Rd. 39°07′51″N 77°23′51″W	Poolesville	Two-story house constructed of local Seneca sandstone, to which are attached a ca. 1835 1 1/2-story log structure, and two small 20th-century one-story frame wings.
77	Walker Prehistoric Village Archeological Site		May 12, 1975 (#75000914)	Selden Island; Address Restricted	Poolesville	Prehistoric Late Woodland period Native American settlement.
78	Washington Aqueduct	Washington Aqueduct	September 8, 1973 (#73002123)	5900 MacArthur Boulevard, NW. 39°00′02″N 77°14′52″W	Great Falls	Built between 1853–1864, its Union Arch Bridge (see above) is listed as a Historic Civil Engineering Landmark
79	Washington Grove Historic District	Washington Grove Historic District	April 9, 1980 (#80001829)	Maryland Route 124; also roughly bounded by Washington Grove Ln., Ridge Rd., and MARC tracks. 39°08′24″N 77°10′28″W	Washington Grove	Community derived from Victorian cottages of a Methodist meeting camp; second set of addresses represent a boundary increase approved September 28, 2020
80	West Montgomery Avenue Historic District	West Montgomery Avenue Historic District	May 29, 1975 (#75000915)	Residential area centered around W. Montgomery Ave. 39°05′02″N 77°09′41″W	Rockville	Within the vicinity of the district are houses dating from the late 18th century to the early 20th century. Architectural styles include those of the early 19th century and Late Victorian period.
81	Wiley-Ringland House	Wiley-Ringland House	November 22, 2000 (#00001392)	4722 Dorset Ave. 38°57′31″N 77°05′43″W	Chevy Chase	2 1/2-story Queen Anne-style frame building built around 1893.
82	Woodend	Woodend	March 20, 1980 (#80001824)	8940 Jones Mill Rd. 39°00′09″N 77°04′01″W	Chevy Chase	2 1/2-story house with Flemish bond brick walls and brick quoins. Constructed in 1929.
83	Robert Llewellyn Wright House	Robert Llewellyn Wright House	August 12, 1986 (#86002621)	7927 Deepwell Dr. 39°00′27″N 77°10′02″W	Bethesda	Two-story concrete-block structure designed by noted architect Frank Lloyd Wright in 1953, and constructed in 1957 for his sixth child. The Usonian house was designed using intersecting and concentric segments of a circle, or "hemicycles".

== See also ==
- List of National Historic Landmarks in Maryland
- National Register of Historic Places listings in Maryland
