= Hanover (disambiguation) =

Hanover (in German: Hannover) is a large city in northern Germany.

Hanover may also refer to:

== Animals ==
- Hanover (horse) (1884–1899), American Thoroughbred racehorse

== People ==
- House of Hanover, a German royal dynasty
- Donna Hanover, American journalist
- Karl Hanover, video game voice actor

== Places ==
=== States or regions of Germany ===
- Hanover Region
  - Hanover Fairground, the largest exhibition ground in the world, located in Hanover, Germany
  - Hannover Messe, the world's biggest industrial fair held each April on the Hanover Fairground
- Hanover (region)
- Electorate of Hanover, unofficial name of Prince-Electorate of Brunswick-Lüneburg (1692/1708−1814)
- Kingdom of Hanover (1814–66)
- Province of Hanover (1866–1946), Prussian province
- State of Hanover, a post-war German state in the British Zone

=== Canada ===
- Rural Municipality of Hanover, Manitoba
  - Hanover School Division
- Hanover, Ontario

=== Chile ===
- Hanover Island, in the Patagonic Archipelago

=== Jamaica ===
- Hanover Parish

=== Papua New Guinea ===
- New Hanover Island, in the Bismarck Archipelago

=== South Africa ===
- Hanover, South Africa, in Northern Cape province

=== United Kingdom ===
- Hanover, Brighton, a suburb within the city of Brighton and Hove

=== United States ===
- Hanover, Connecticut
- Hanover, Illinois
- Hanover, Indiana
- Hanover, Kansas
- Hanover, Maine
- Hanover, Maryland
- Hanover, Massachusetts
- Hanover, Michigan
- Hanover, Minnesota
- Hanover, New Hampshire, a New England town
  - Hanover (CDP), New Hampshire, the main village in the town
- Hanover, New Mexico
- Hanover, New York
- Hannover, North Dakota
- Hanover, Ohio
- Hanover, Pennsylvania
  - Battle of Hanover
- Hanover, Virginia
- Hanover, Wisconsin
- Hanover County, Virginia
- East Hanover Township, New Jersey
- North Hanover Township, New Jersey

== Ships ==
- Hanover, Falmouth Packet ship wrecked off Cornwall in December 1763
- MV Hannover, a Norddeutscher Lloyd cargo liner captured by the Royal Navy in 1940

== Other uses ==
- Hanover (automobile), a former American automobile manufacturer
- Hanover College, a private liberal arts college in Hanover, Indiana, United States
- Hanover Farm House, a historic house in Maryland, United States
- Hanover Finance, a failed financial company that was based in New Zealand
- Hanoverian horse, a German horse breed
- Hanover Insurance, an insurance company based in Worcester, Massachusetts
- Hanover Shoe, an American shoe company
- Hanover-Taché Hockey League, a defunct senior ice hockey league in Manitoba, Canada
- Hanover Tache Junior Hockey League, a junior ice hockey league in Manitoba, Canada
- Snyder's of Hanover, a bakery and snack food distribution company based in Hanover, Pennsylvania
- Hanover Lutheran Church, a congregation in Cape Girardeau, Missouri
- Manufacturers Hanover Corporation, a former bank holding company
- Hanover, a musical piece by composer Alvin Lucier
- Hanover F.C., a football cub in Northern Ireland

== See also ==
- Hannover (disambiguation)
- Hanover Airport (disambiguation)
- Hanover House (disambiguation)
- Hanover Park (disambiguation)
- Hanover Square (disambiguation)
- Hanover Street (disambiguation)
- Hanover Township (disambiguation)
