= Mount Nebo (disambiguation) =

Mount Nebo is a mountain in the present-day Western Jordan on which, according to the Bible, the prophet Moses died.

Mount Nebo may also refer to:

== Australia ==
- Mount Nebo (Queensland), a rural locality, and part of the D'Aguilar Range, Queensland
- Mount Nebo (New South Wales), a hill near Wollongong and part of the foothills of Mount Keira

== Ireland ==
- Raheencullen or Mount Nebo, an estate of John Hunter Gowan II near Craanford in north County Wexford

== Philippines ==
- Mount Nebo, Bukidnon, a barangay of Valencia City, Bukidnon

== United States ==
- Mount Nebo (Arkansas), south of the Arkansas River in central Arkansas, home of Mount Nebo State Park
- Mount Nebo (Poolesville, Maryland)
- Mount Nebo (Minnesota), a large hill in Todd County, central Minnesota
- Mount Nebo (New York), a mountain in the Catskills
- Mount Nebo Archaeological District, a group of archaeological sites in Ohio
- Mount Nebo (Oregon), at the boundary of the Eagle Cap Wilderness
- Mount Nebo, Allegheny County, Pennsylvania
- Mount Nebo, Lancaster County, Pennsylvania, a place in Pennsylvania
- Mount Nebo, Westmoreland County, Pennsylvania, a place in Pennsylvania
- Mount Nebo (Utah), the highest point in the Wasatch Range of Utah
- Mount Nebo, Nicholas County, West Virginia
- Mount Nebo, Preston County, West Virginia

== Other uses ==
- Mount Nebo Cemetery, Carlton, Clarke County, Alabama

== See also ==
- Naboo, fictional place in Star Wars
