= Dromedary Hills =

Coordinates: 46°2′55″N 94°43′46″W

The Dromedary Hills are an area of morainic drift hills in section 28, Little Elk Township in Todd County, Minnesota, United States. These hills were named for their rounded outlines, like a camel's hump. The Dromedary Hills are one of only two hills or "localities of hills" in Todd County which have received names on maps, the other being Mount Nebo.
