= Annington =

Annington may refer to:

- Annington, West Sussex, a hamlet in England
- Annington (Poolesville, Maryland), US
