= East Hanover =

East Hanover is the name of the following places in the United States of America:

- East Hanover Township, New Jersey
- East Hanover Township, Dauphin County, Pennsylvania
- East Hanover Township, Lebanon County, Pennsylvania

East Hanover was the name of:

- East Hanover (electoral district), former German electoral district for the Reichstag between 1920 and 1933

== See also ==
- Hanover, the German city
- Hanover (disambiguation) for other places called Hanover
