= Mount Nebo, West Virginia =

Mount Nebo, West Virginia may refer to:

- Mount Nebo, Nicholas County, West Virginia, an unincorporated community in Nicholas County
- Mount Nebo, Preston County, West Virginia, an unincorporated community in Preston County
