= Clarksburg School =

Clarksburg School may refer to:

- Clarksburg School (Clarksburg, Maryland), listed on the National Register of Historic Places in Montgomery County, Maryland
- Clarksburg School (Clarksburg, New Jersey), listed on the National Register of Historic Places in Monmouth County, New Jersey
