= Edward Beale =

Edward Beale may refer to:

- Edward Fitzgerald Beale (1822–1893), American naval officer, military general, explorer, frontiersman, Indian affairs superintendent, California rancher and diplomat
- Edward K. Beale (born 1970), United States Coast Guard officer and award-winning author
- Edward Beale House

== See also ==
- Edward Beale McLean (1889–1941), American publisher and owner of the Washington Post
- Eddie Beal (1910–1984), American jazz pianist
