= Hanover Square =

Hanover Square may refer to:

- Hanover Square, Westminster, in London, England
- Hanover Square, Manhattan, New York City, New York, USA
  - Hanover Square (IRT Third Avenue Line), elevated station
- Hanover Square, Syracuse, New York, USA

== See also ==
- Hanover (disambiguation)
- Hanover Square Rooms, London
- Hanover Square Historic District (Horseheads, New York)
- Hangover Square
