= Hannover (disambiguation) =

Hannover is a German city.

Hannover may also refer to:

- Hannover (aircraft), airplanes produced by Hannoversche Waggonfabrik
- Hannover Re, an insurance company based in Hanover, Germany
- Hannover Airport, Hanover's international airport
- Hannover Hauptbahnhof, Hanover's main railway station
- Hannover Messe, the world's biggest industrial fair
- Hannover 96, German association football team currently playing in the Bundesliga
- Hannover Indians, German ice hockey team
- Hannover Scorpions, German ice hockey team
- MV Hannover, a Norddeutscher Lloyd cargo liner captured by the Royal Navy in 1940
- Zeche Hannover, a former mine complex in Hordel, part of the city of Bochum in the Ruhr area in North Rhine-Westphalia

== Other uses ==
- Hannoversche Waggonfabrik, a former manufacturer of trains, cars and airplanes, known as "Hannover" in English
- Hannoversch Münden (confluence in Hanover), a town in Lower Saxony, former Province of Hanover

== See also ==
- Hanover (disambiguation)
