= Robert Llewellyn Wright House =

Historic house in Maryland, United States

- U.S. National Register of Historic Places
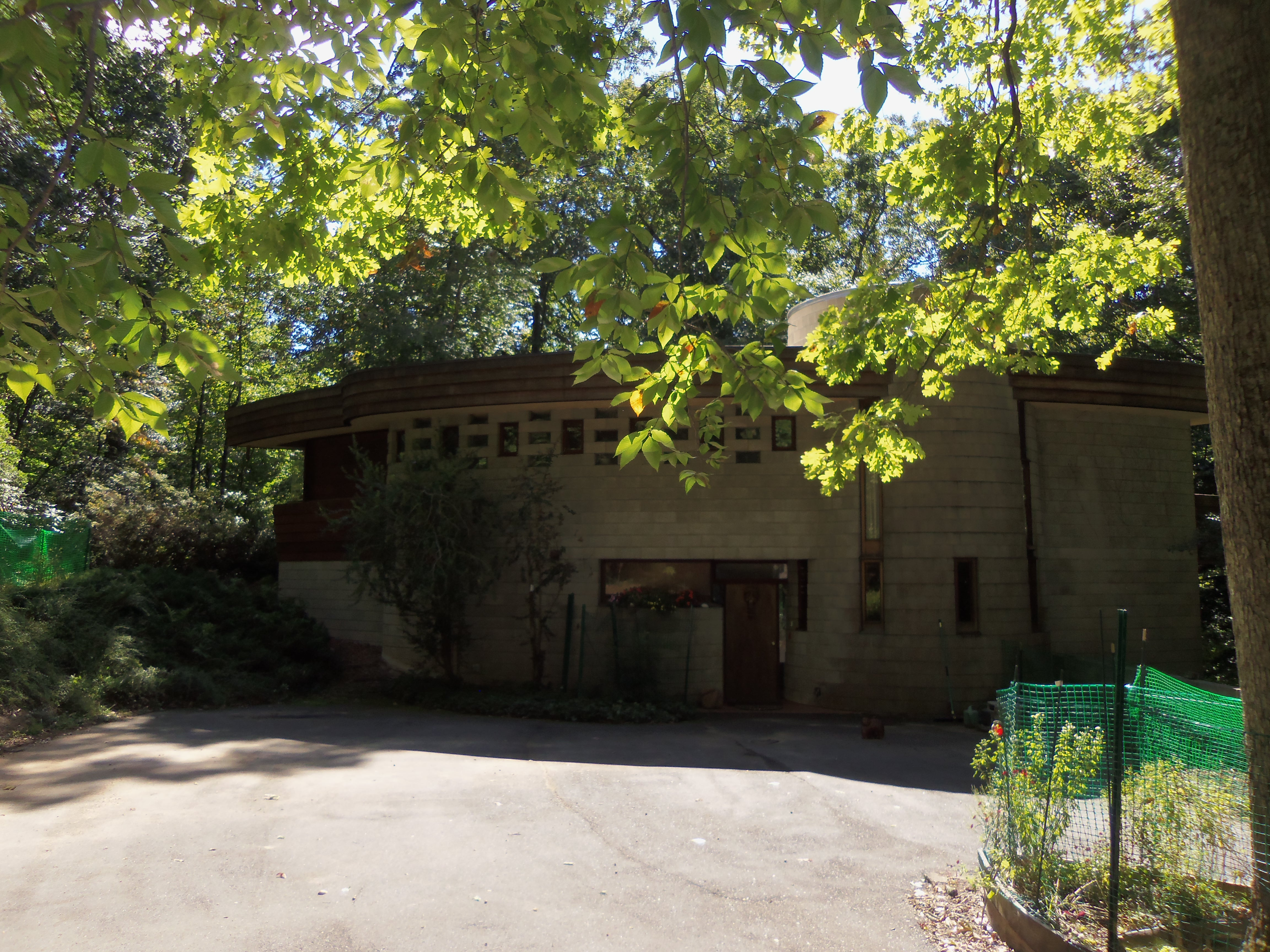
- Robert Llewellyn Wright House, September 2012

- Location within Maryland Location within the United States
- Interactive map showing the Robert Llewelyn House
- Location: 7927 Deepwell Drive; Bethesda, Maryland
- Coordinates: 39°0′27.71″N 77°10′0.62″W
- Area: 2 acres (0.81 ha)
- Built: 1957
- Architect: Wright, Frank Lloyd; Beharka, Robert
- Architectural style: Hemicyclical, Usonian
- NRHP reference No.: 86002621
- Added to NRHP: August 12, 1986

The Robert Llewellyn Wright House is a historic home located at 7927 Deepwell Drive in Bethesda, Maryland. It is an 1,800-square-foot (170 m^{2}), two-story concrete-block structure designed by architect Frank Lloyd Wright in 1953, and constructed in 1957 for his sixth child, Robert Llewellyn Wright (1903–86), who worked at the Justice Department.

The Usonian house was designed using intersecting and concentric segments of a circle, or "hemicycles". Initial designs were scrapped after the construction was too costly.

The house can be seen from Deepwell Drive on a sloping lot that overlooks a stream. It is also visible from the Cabin John Stream Valley Trail, which follows the Cabin John Creek below it. In 1960, the grounds were landscaped by Lloyd Wright, brother of the client and the son of the architect.

As of 2010, the house was inhabited by Tom Wright, the grandson of Frank Lloyd Wright, and a volcano specialist.

It is one of only two Wright-designed structures in Maryland; the other is the Joseph Euchtman House in Baltimore County.

== See also ==
- List of Frank Lloyd Wright works
- National Register of Historic Places listings in Montgomery County, Maryland
