= Little Elk Township, Todd County, Minnesota =

Little Elk Township, Minnesota
- Township
- Location within the state of Minnesota Little Elk Township, Minnesota (the United States)
- Coordinates: 46°2′38″N 94°42′53″W
- Country: United States
- State: Minnesota
- County: Todd

Area
  - Total: 36.0 sq mi (93.2 km^{2})
  - Land: 34.7 sq mi (90.0 km^{2})
  - Water: 1.2 sq mi (3.2 km^{2})
- Elevation: 1,280 ft (390 m)

Population (2020)
  - Total: 266
  - Density: 9.8/sq mi (3.8/km^{2})
- Time zone: UTC-6 (Central (CST))
  - Summer (DST): UTC-5 (CDT)
- FIPS code: 27-37538
- GNIS feature ID: 0664800

Little Elk Township is a township in Todd County, Minnesota, United States. The population was 340 at the 2000 census and was 266 at the time of the 2020 Census.

The South Fork of Little Elk River has its headwaters in the township and the township was named after the Little Elk River. The River flows eastward into Morrison County where it joins the Mississippi River above the town of Little Falls.

== Geography ==
According to the United States Census Bureau, the township has a total area of 36.0 square miles (93 km^{2}), of which 34.8 square miles (90 km^{2}) is land and 1.2 square miles (3.1 km^{2}) (3.45%) is water.

== Demographics ==
As of the census of 2000, there were 340 people, 120 households, and 96 families residing in the township. The population density was 9.8 inhabitants per square mile (3.8/km^{2}). There were 159 housing units at an average density of 4.6 units per square mile (1.8 units/km^{2}). The racial makeup of the township was 92.94% White, 0.29% Native American, 0.29% Asian, and 6.47% from two or more races. Hispanic or Latino of any race were 0.59% of the population.

There were 120 households, out of which 35.8% had children under the age of 18 living with them, 68.3% were married couples living together, 7.5% had a female householder with no husband present, and 20.0% were non-families. 19.2% of all households were made up of individuals, and 8.3% had someone living alone who was 65 years of age or older. The average household size was 2.83 and the average family size was 3.22.

In the township the population was spread out, with 29.1% under the age of 18, 7.1% from 18 to 24, 25.0% from 25 to 44, 25.6% from 45 to 64, and 13.2% who were 65 years of age or older. The median age was 38 years. For every 100 females, there were 106.1 males. For every 100 females age 18 and over, there were 119.1 males.

The median income for a household in the township was $37,679, and the median income for a family was $41,250. Males had a median income of $27,500 versus $17,125 for females. The per capita income for the township was $14,850. About 6.5% of families and 5.9% of the population were below the poverty line, including 4.8% of those under age 18 and 17.5% of those age 65 or over.

== See also ==
- Dromedary Hills
