= United States Department of Energy complex (Germantown, Maryland) =

- U.S. Atomic Energy Commission
- U.S. National Register of Historic Places
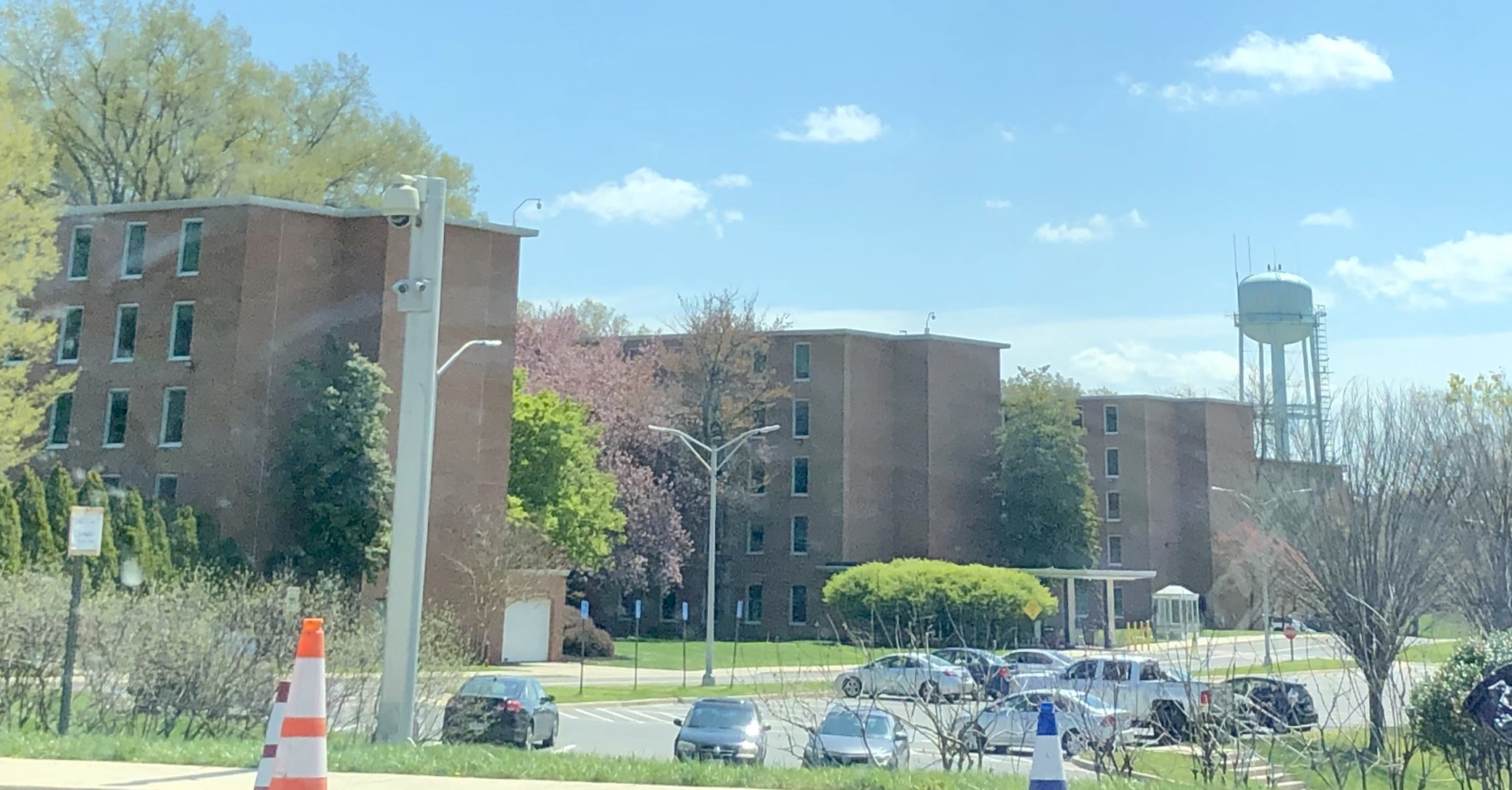

- Location within Maryland Location within the United States
- Location: 19901 Germantown Rd. Germantown, Maryland
- Coordinates: 39°10′50″N 77°15′23″W
- Area: 98.6 acres (39.9 ha)
- NRHP reference No.: 16000275
- Added to NRHP: May 23, 2016

The United States Department of Energy complex is one of two administrative complexes of the United States Department of Energy. It is located at 19901 Germantown Road in Germantown, Maryland, on a campus originally developed in the 1950s as the headquarters of the Atomic Energy Commission. The complex's original five buildings were designed by the New York City architectural firm Voorhees, Walker, Smith & Smith, a firm prominent in the development of laboratories and associated facilities. It was sited at what was believed to be a distance far enough from Washington, DC to survive a nuclear blast on that city.

The complex was listed on the National Register of Historic Places in 2016.

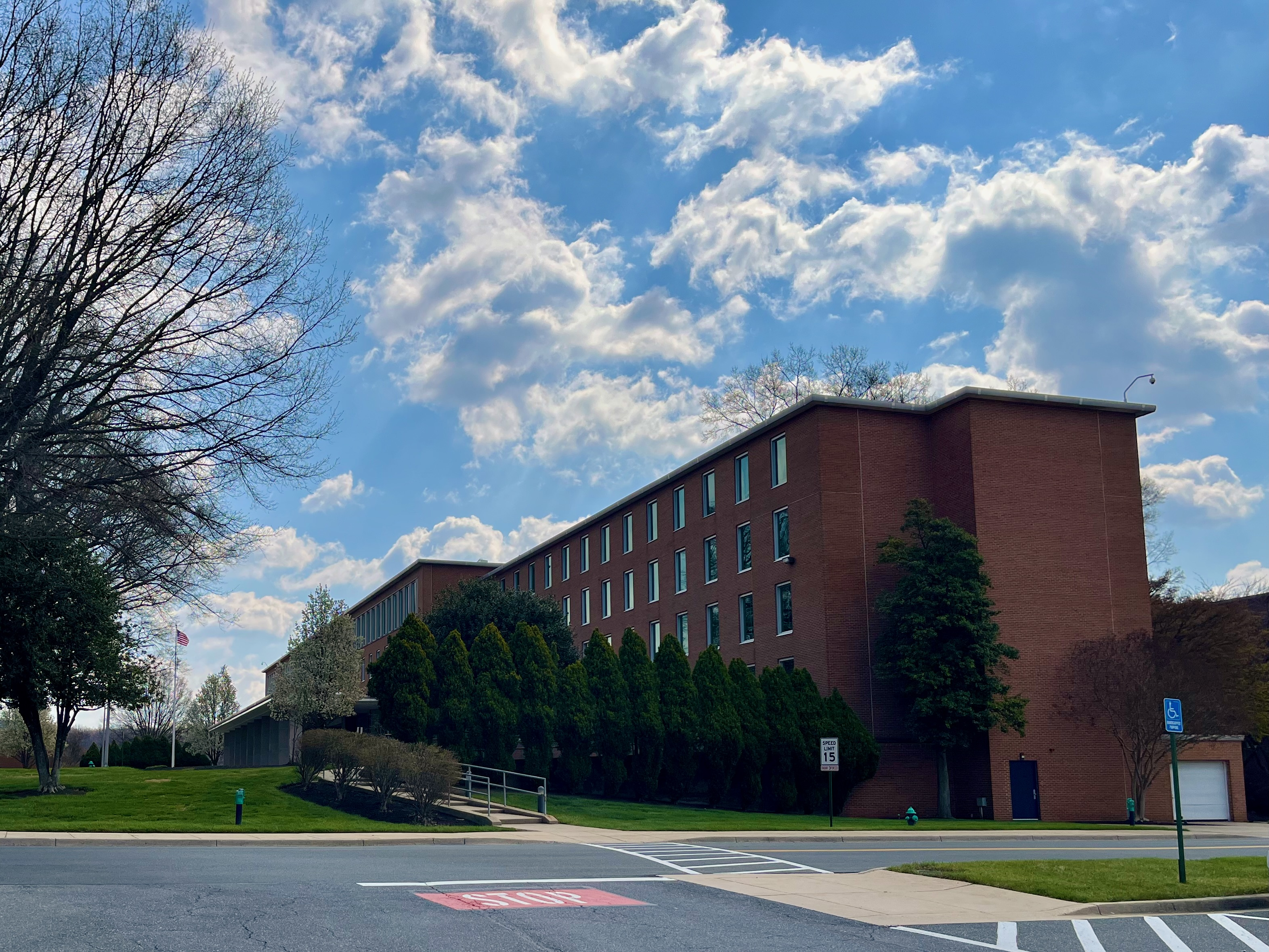
Department of Energy Germantown Office

== See also ==
- National Register of Historic Places listings in Montgomery County, Maryland
