= Hanover House =

Hanover House may refer to:

- House of Hanover, a German royal dynasty
- The Hanover House, a 2014 independent horror film by Corey Newman
- Hanover House (Clemson), a French Huguenot house in South Carolina
- Hanover House (Sheffield), a brutalist apartment block in Sheffield, England
- Hanover Farm House, a historic home located at Beallsville, Montgomery County, Maryland
- Hanover Courthouse, Virginia, a courthouse associated with the Battle of Hanover Court House
- Hanover Meeting House, another name for the Polegreen Church
- Hanover House, a former imprint of Doubleday

== See also ==
- Hannover House, an American entertainment media distributor
