= Hanover Park =

Hanover Park may refer to:

- Hanover Park, Cape Town in South Africa
- Hanover Park, Illinois in the United States

== Education ==
- Hanover Park High School in the Hanover Park Regional High School District, United States
- Hanover Park Regional High School District in Morris County, New Jersey, United States

== Other ==
- Hanover Park F.C. a soccer club based in Hanover Park, Cape Town, South Africa.
- Hanover Park station, a station in Hanover Park, Illinois, United States
