= Nathan Dickerson Poole House =

Historic house in Maryland, United States

- U.S. National Register of Historic Places
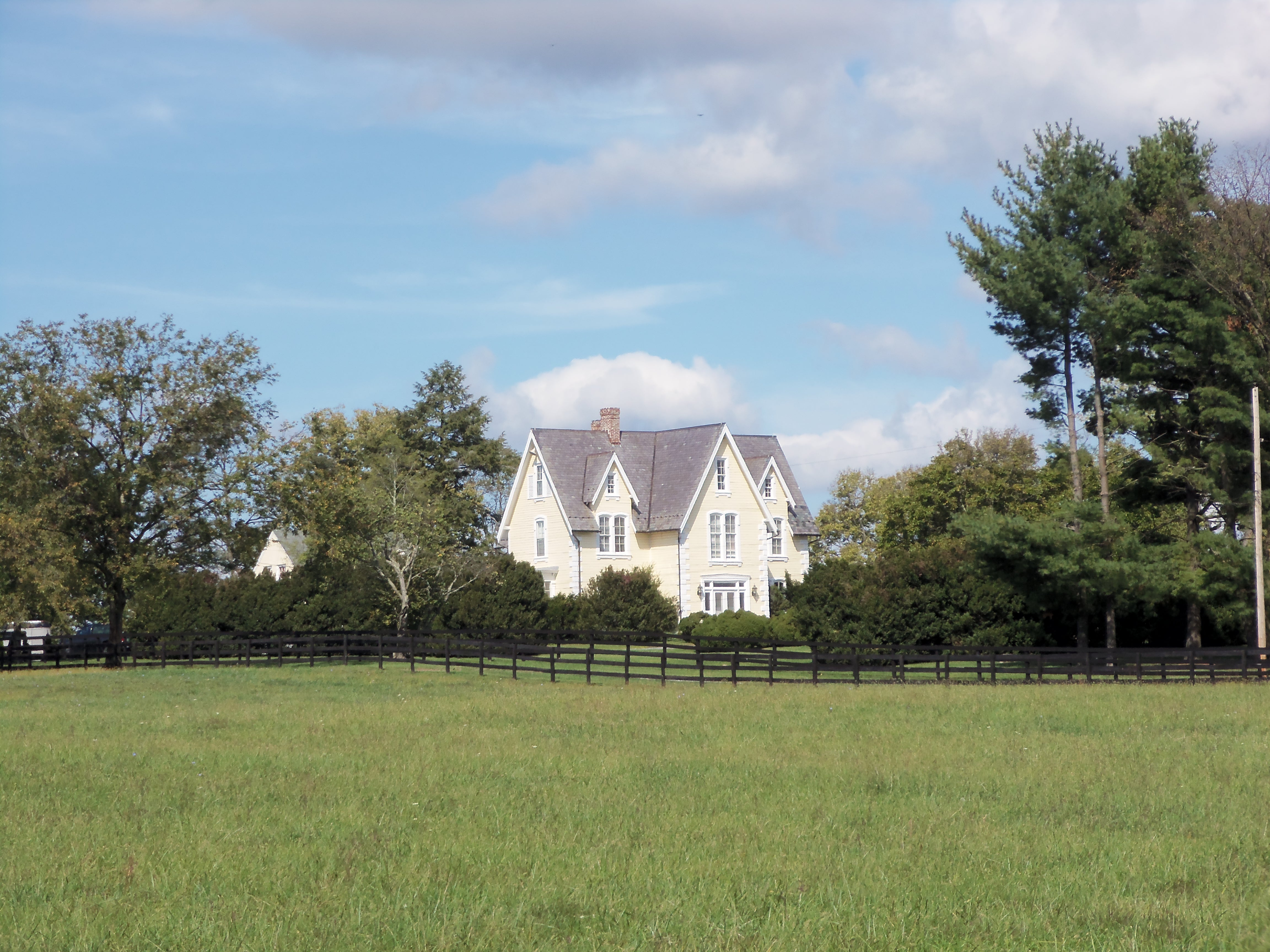
- Nathan Dickerson Poole House, September 2012

- Location within Maryland Location within the United States
- Location: 15600 Edwards Ferry Rd., Poolesville, Maryland
- Coordinates: 39°6′43″N 77°27′56″W
- Area: 15.5 acres (6.3 ha)
- Built: 1871
- Architectural style: Gothic, Italianate, Villa Farmhouse
- NRHP reference No.: 83002957
- Added to NRHP: January 24, 1983

The Nathan Dickerson Poole House is a historic home located at Poolesville, Montgomery County, Maryland. It is a 2 1/2-story, frame dwelling, constructed in 1871 and its design combines elements of the Victorian Gothic and Italianate styles. Also on the property are a frame barn and corn shed of early-20th-century date.

It was listed on the National Register of Historic Places in 1983.
