= Hanover Lutheran Church =

Historic church in Missouri, United States

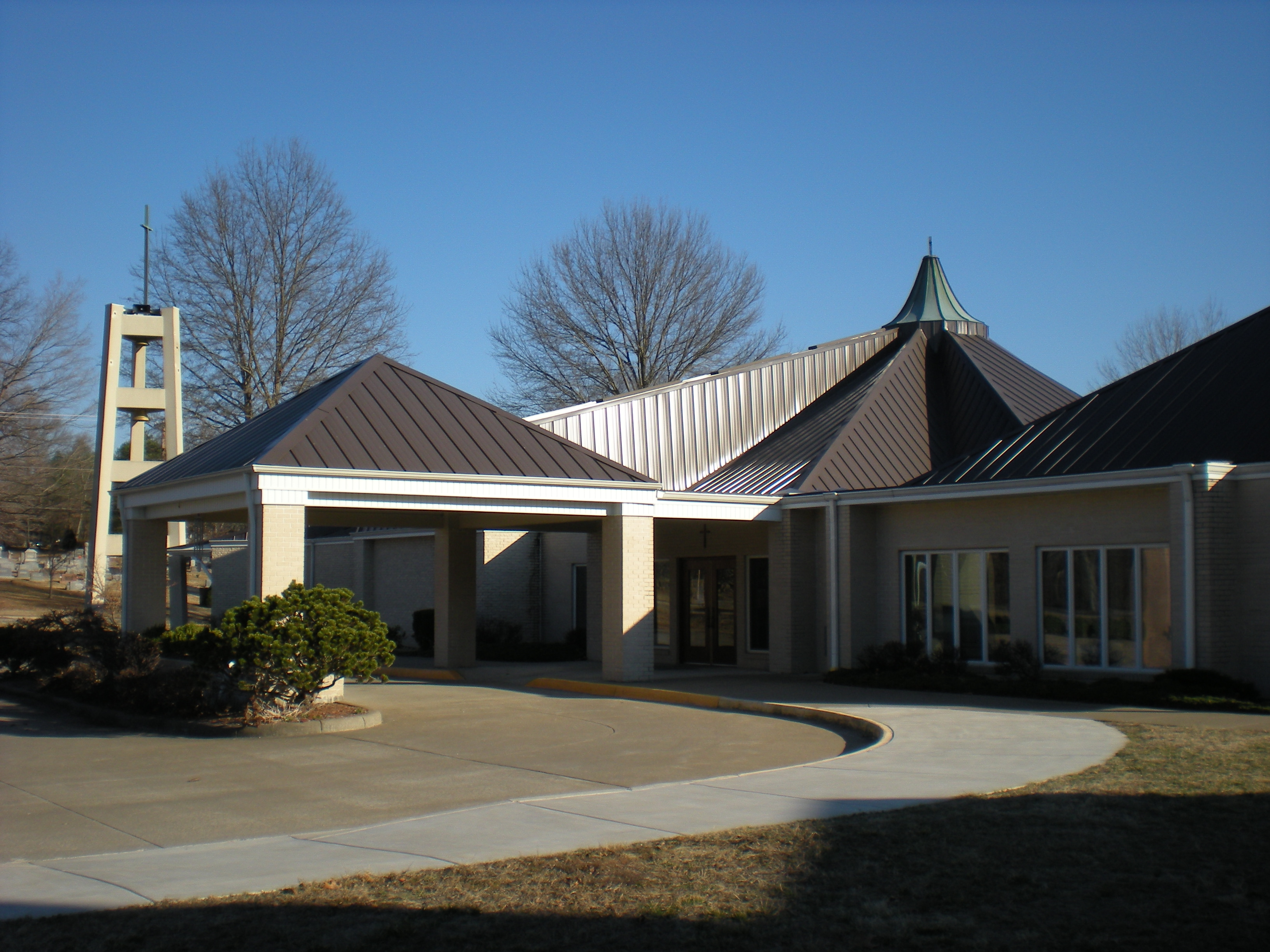
- Hanover's current sanctuary, February 2011

- Missouri

Religion
- Affiliation: Lutheran Church–Missouri Synod
- District: Missouri District
- Leadership: Rev. Rod Benkendorf

Location
- Location: 2949 Perryville Road; Cape Girardeau, Missouri, 63701, U.S.A.
- Interactive map of Hanover Lutheran Church

Website
- Hanover Lutheran Church
- Old Hanover Lutheran Church
- U.S. National Register of Historic Places
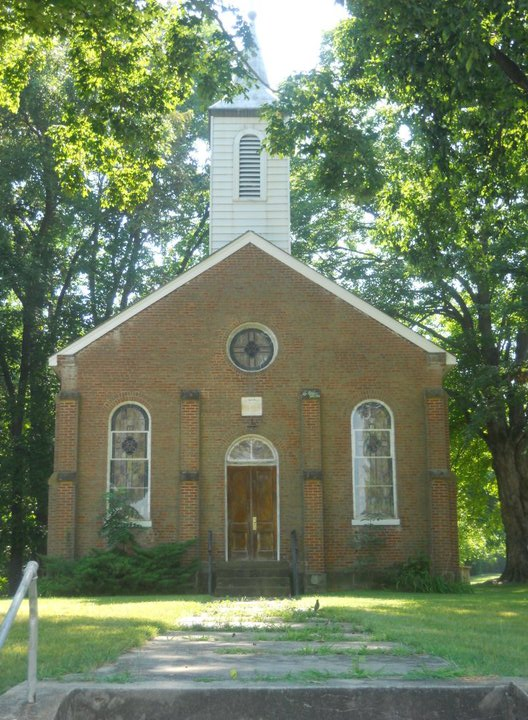
- Hanover's second church building

- Location within Missouri Location within the United States
- Coordinates: 37°21′10″N 89°33′37″W
- Area: less than one acre
- Built: 1887
- Architect: Regenhardt, William; Savers, Will
- Architectural style: Gothic
- NRHP reference No.: 87001575
- Added to NRHP: September 14, 1987

Hanover Lutheran Church is a Lutheran congregation in Cape Girardeau, Missouri, that is a member of the Lutheran Church–Missouri Synod. The congregation's original organization came about in 1846 as a result of the heavy German immigration to Missouri in the 19th century. The church's name, "Hanover", was chosen to reflect the place of origin of the majority of its members, since many of the Germans who had settled northwest of the town of Cape Girardeau had immigrated from the Kingdom of Hanover.

Hanover's original log-cabin church building served the congregation from 1846 until 1887, when the second church building was constructed on land donated by church member Henry Krueger. This second church building was in active use from the time of its construction in 1887 until the current building was constructed in 1969. The building is still standing today in its original location, alongside the schoolhouse building which was constructed in 1923. On September 14, 1987, both buildings were added to the National Register of Historic Places as Historic Hanover Lutheran Church and School.

The 579-member congregation, currently pastored by Rev. Rod Benkendorf, is often considered to be the mother Church of several Lutheran congregations in Cape Girardeau County, which include Eisleben Lutheran Church in Scott City; Trinity Lutheran Church in Cape Girardeau; Trinity Lutheran Church in Egypt Mills; and St. Paul Lutheran Church in Jackson. The church is currently located on the northern limits of the city on gently sloping ground on Perryville Road.

== History ==
=== German immigration to Missouri ===
The heavy German immigration to Missouri in the 19th century produced a network of German settlements concentrated in counties along the Missouri and Mississippi Rivers. While St. Louis evolved as the state's principal German city, smaller river towns and counties such as Hermann and Washington on the Missouri River, and Cape Girardeau, located about 100 miles (160 km) south of St. Louis on the Mississippi, also became well known for their distinct German character.

Before 1846, there were several Lutheran families who had migrated from a 50-mile (80 km) that included the German cities of Hanover and Braunschweig to a new settlement in America, north of Cape Girardeau, Missouri. These families gathered together for worship in the homes of individuals until the arrival of Daniel Bertling, a carpenter who allowed worship services to be held in the carpentry shop located on his farm.

=== Early years: 1846-1887 ===
Sketch of Hanover's first log-cabin church

In 1846, the first Lutheran congregation was formally organized and officially named the "Evangelical Lutheran Congregation of the Unaltered Augsburg Confession, Hannover, Cape Girardeau County, Missouri." This title which the church chose acknowledged and reflected both their European place of origin of many of its members as well as the dispersed rural community northwest of the town of Cape Girardeau where the seeds of a "New Hannover" were being sown. Land for the very first log-cabin church building was given to the congregation by the carpenter Daniel Bertling, located near the present intersection between Melrose and Delwin streets. The land was cleared of trees by congregation members and the logs were prepared for the building. Fortunately for the congregation, many of the German settlers were very skilled and had the tools needed to construct a church building from logs, due to the fact that logs were used often in Germany for home and barn building.

The finished church building measured 25 by 40 feet (7.6 m × 12.2 m). Inside the building were a pump organ in the front left corner, an altar in the center, a high pulpit to the right of the altar, a box stove with a pipe, and two rows of benches without backs. Whitewashed logs could be seen and the floor was made of split logs with the faces smoothed. A row of pegs on the rear wall served as hangers for hats and coats. The men sat on the right side of the church, and the women sat on the left. This building was also used as the first location of Hanover's day school, begun shortly after the construction of the church building. Classes were held during the day in the church building, and taught originally by Christian August Lehmann, the first pastor of the congregation.

In 1848, a modest parsonage was constructed about 30 feet (9.1 m) feet from the northwest corner of the church. This building measured 20 by 25 feet (6.1 m × 7.6 m) and was also constructed with logs. In 1850, the first burial was recorded in the cemetery, located adjacent to the church building on the west side. The church formally joined the Lutheran Church-Missouri Synod in 1875. By the mid-1870s, plans were under discussion for relocating the church in order to better serve the growing congregation, many of whom lived several miles north of the log building. In 1875, the congregation approved a site two miles (3.2 km) north along Perryville Road, a narrow dirt lane leading to Cape Girardeau. The land was purchased from the Christian Niemeier family. The next year, a modest 4-room parsonage and a frame school were completed.

=== Second church: 1887-1969 ===
Sketch of Hanover's second schoolhouse

In 1887, land for a new church directly across the road from the new parsonage and frame school was donated by congregation member Henry Krueger, a native of Braunschweig, Germany. Typical of rural Missouri German churches, which rarely were built in a valley bottom, the new church was picturesquely sited in a wooded area at the crest of gently sloping ground. The materials, styling, and meticulous craftsmanship of the church also were characteristic of rural German traditions in the state. The church was built during the pastorate of Otto R. Hueschen, and was completed in 1887 by William Regenhardt, a local builder. It was constructed of red brick, the preferred German building material. Studies of Missouri church buildings revealed that 84 percent of churches in German areas were of masonry construction.

The solidly built walls, three bricks thick, display attention to construction and detail, which German church-expert Osmund Overby referred to as "a measure of the culture of the German settlers in Missouri," expressing a "German sense of craftsmanship and permanence," suggesting the immigrants were "consciously creating a legacy for their descendents." The plain, simple design of the church is typical of rural immigrant churches which are almost devoid of architectural style except for round- or pointed-arch windows associated with Romanesque and Gothic sources. Pierced with round-arched openings, Hanover's second church building is given further definition by off-set buttresses capped with sandstone from a local quarry. Following German custom, a stone inscribed with the church's name and date of construction is located over the front doorway. The slender bell tower, of frame construction, is sheathed with galvanized tin. The interior is very simply articulated with a vaulted ceiling covered with ornamental pressed tin. Double stairs lead to a balcony at the west end of the building.

Hanover's third schoolhouse, May 2011

In 1923, a new one-room school building was completed adjacent to the church. It offered elementary education through eighth grade, entitling graduates admission to any public high school in Missouri. During the years of operation (1924–1955), enrollment reached a high of 42 students. The 22-by-50-foot (6.7 m × 15.2 m) building was built by Will Savers, a local contractor, after members of the congregation had dug the basement with picks, shovels, and horse-powered slip scrapers. The red brick school with 12-inch (300 mm) walls exhibits the same high quality of workmanship found in the church. The school's rectangular plan and symmetrical front with a single, centered door facing the road on the short side of the building are basic vernacular design elements found nationwide. The round-arched doorway with date stone above echoes the church building's entrance. Segmentally-arched windows on the side elevations conserve a 19th-century form favored by German builders long after straight lintel-headed openings were commonplace in non-German structures. The low-hipped roof with dormer and overhanging eave, however, indicate stylistic influence of the bungalow, as seen nationally in 1920s rural school architecture. A20-foot (6.1 m) addition to the east end of the school in 1935 provided stage space for the Hanover Dramatic Club. The imperceptible joining of the addition to the school is testimony to the skilled hands of local masons as is the well-proportioned arch which houses a cistern on the south side of the building.

Over the years, Hanover Lutheran gained additional stature as the mother church of several county congregations that were organized and served by Hanover pastors. They include Eisleben Lutheran (1851), Scott City; Trinity Lutheran (1854), Cape Girardeau; Egypt Mills Lutheran (1867), Cape Girardeau, and St. Paul Lutheran (1893), Jackson. All of the historic church buildings constructed by these congregations have been demolished, leaving Hanover Lutheran the sole property associated with the German Lutheran heritage in the city of Cape Girardeau and one of the few remaining in the county. With great respect and appreciation of the significance of the brick church and school, the congregation decided to preserve the buildings after completion in 1969 of a spacious new church across the road.

=== Third church: 1969-present ===
It was again becoming apparent that Hanover Lutheran Church was approaching the end of another era. The 1887 second church, which had served so well in its time, was no longer able to meet the needs of the congregation. Cape Girardeau was rapidly expanding northwestward and Hanover was in transition from a rural to a suburban community. A planning committee was appointed, and most of the initial planning was done over a two-year period while the congregation was without a resident pastor and was being served by Pastor Robert Olson of Gordonville, Missouri. In the summer of 1968, the plan for a modern-type church building was presented to the congregation, and it met with unanimous approval. In order to execute the plans for the new church building, the existing parsonage had to be torn down and the croquet court removed. On October 14, 1968, a motion to approve the cost of $162,290 was approved at Hanover's regular congregational meeting.

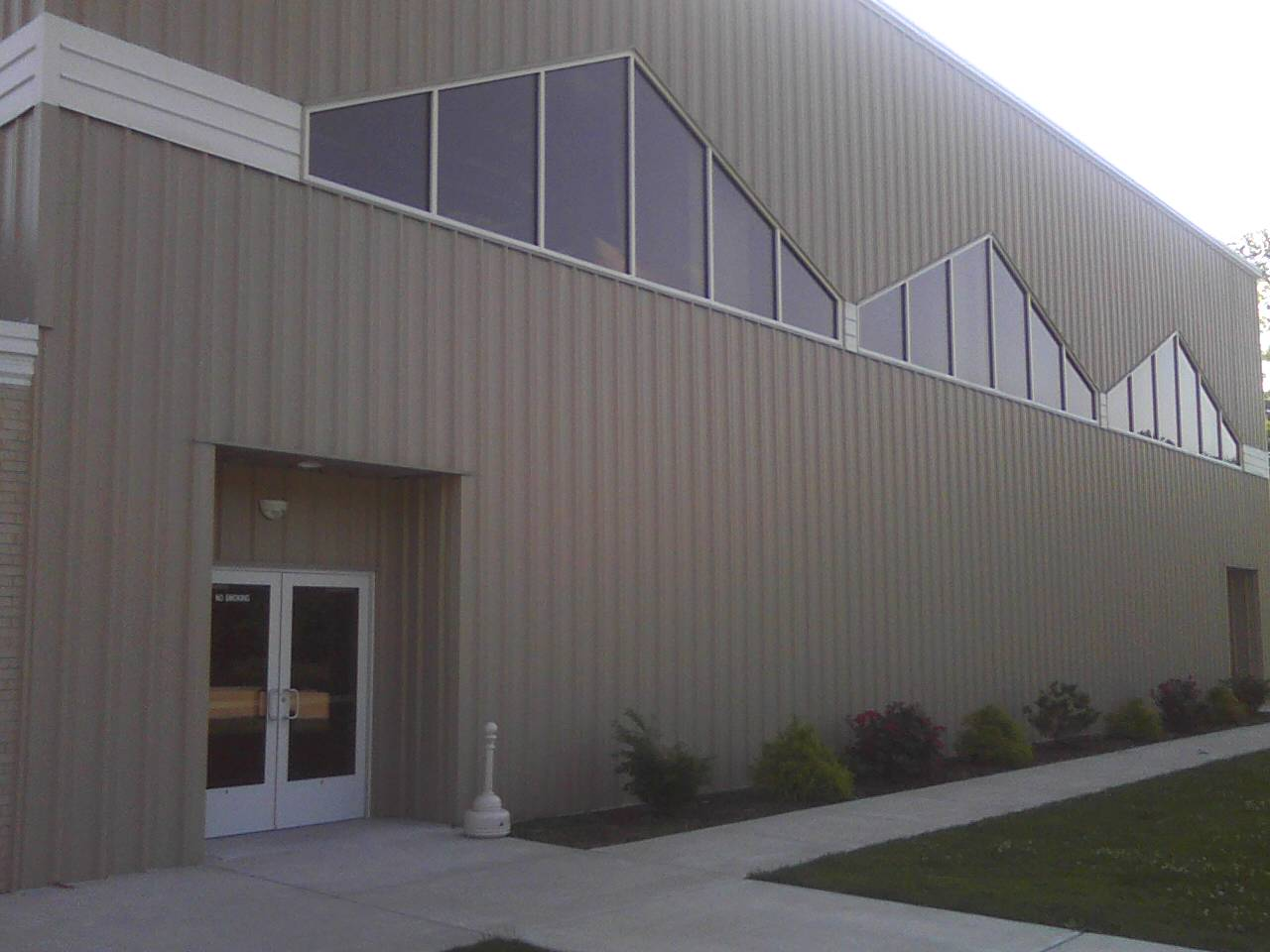
Hanover's Activity Center, May 2011

The new church building was completed in 1969, and was dedicated on November 30 of that year. Between 1700 and 1800 people attended the dedication services that day. Special speakers included Rev. E. H. Koerber, at that time the assistant pastor of Trinity Lutheran Church in Cape Girardeau; Rev. Walter H. Schwaub, at that time the assistant pastor of St. Paul's Lutheran Church in Concordia, Missouri; and Rev. Herman C. Scherer, at that time the president of the Missouri District of the Lutheran Church-Missouri Synod. These events all took place under the pastorate of Rev. Ellis Rottman.

Since then, other buildings projects have been completed, which have added to the worship life of the congregation and have helped to accommodate the congregation's growth over the years. In 1991, an addition to the church building was constructed, which provided space for a meeting room, offices, and classrooms. Later, Hanover's Men's Club constructed a building in which they continue to prepare for their semi-annual Sausage Supper. The church's Dartball team also uses the Men's Club building for its competitions. A pavilion was erected just beyond that building which includes picnic tables and a scenic place to have outdoor events. Finally, in 2008, Hanover completed construction on its newest building, the Activity Center, which houses a full-size gymnasium, a state-of-the-art kitchen facility, as well as extra classrooms for Hanover's youth ministry.

== Ministry ==
The most recent pastor of Hanover Lutheran Church since February 7, 2021, is Rod Benkendorf, who earned a Master of Divinity degree and Master of Sacred Theology degree from Concordia Seminary in St. Louis, Missouri.

Hanover Lutheran Church's staff of six includes a secretary, a housekeeper, music director, and youth director. The congregation is a member of the Cape Girardeau circuit (Circuit 003) of the Missouri District. In addition to Sunday morning worship services, the congregation offers Sunday school classes, various adult Bible study classes, and youth activities. The music program includes an adult choir, as well as handbell ringers.

=== Pastors ===
The pastors who have served calls to Hanover Lutheran Church throughout its history, with their years of appointment, are:

- Christian August Lehmann (1846-1854)
- Robert Eduard Knoll (1855-1857)
- Joachim Friedrich Daries (1857-1865)
- Jacob Schwab (1865-1866)
- Eduard Arnold Veerhoff (1867-1868)
- Wilhelm Gottfried Weissinger (1868-1870)
- William Gustav Polack (1870-1877)
- Johann Heinrich Christoph Guemmer (1877-1886)
- Otto Raphael Heuschen (1886-1892)
- Carl Friedrich P. Rehahn (1892-1905)
- Hermann Heinrich Wilhelm Kellermann (1905-1908)
- George Kirschke (1909-1910)
- Albert Carl Bernthal (1910-1917)

- Ernst Carl Schutt (1917-1922)
- Alexander Georg Heinrich Wagner (1923-1928)
- William Wittrock (1928-1955)
- Robert J. Mueller (1956-1957)
- William Opitz (1958-1960)
- David Loesch (1962-1966)
- Ellis T. Rottmann (1968-1973)
- Robert J. Daniel (1974-1989)
- Jeffrey E. Sippy (1990-2002)
- Daniel Hackney (2004-2008)
- Roger Henning (2008-2009)
- Anthony Kobak (2009-2019)
- Rod Benkendorf (2021-present)

== Bibliography ==
- Gerlach, Russel L. (1976). Immigrants in the Ozarks: A Study in Ethnic Geography. Columbia, MO: University of Missouri Press.
- Gulliford, Andrew (1984). America's Country Schools. Washington, DC: The Preservation Press.
- Kamphoefner, Walter D. (1984). Chain Migration and Local Homogeneity of Immigration: Cape Girardeau County Germans in Comparative Perspective. Paper delivered at the Pioneer Society Annual Meeting.
- Kinder, Elroy F.; et al. (1986). History of Hanover Evangelical Lutheran Church. Cape Girardeau, MO: Hanover Evangelical Lutheran Church.
- Overby, Osmund (1986). German Churches in the Pelster Housebarn Neighborhood. University of Missouri Press.
- Walter A. Schroeder (1986). "Rural Settlement Patterns of the German-Missourian Cultural Landscape". In H. W. Marshall and J. W. Goodrich (ed.). The German-American Experience in Missouri. Columbia, MO: University of Missouri.
- van Ravenswaay, Charles (1977). The Arts and Architecture of German Settlements in Missouri: A Survey of a Vanishing Culture. Columbia, MO: University of Missouri Press.
