= Clifton (Ednor, Maryland) =

Historic house in Maryland, United States

- U.S. National Register of Historic Places
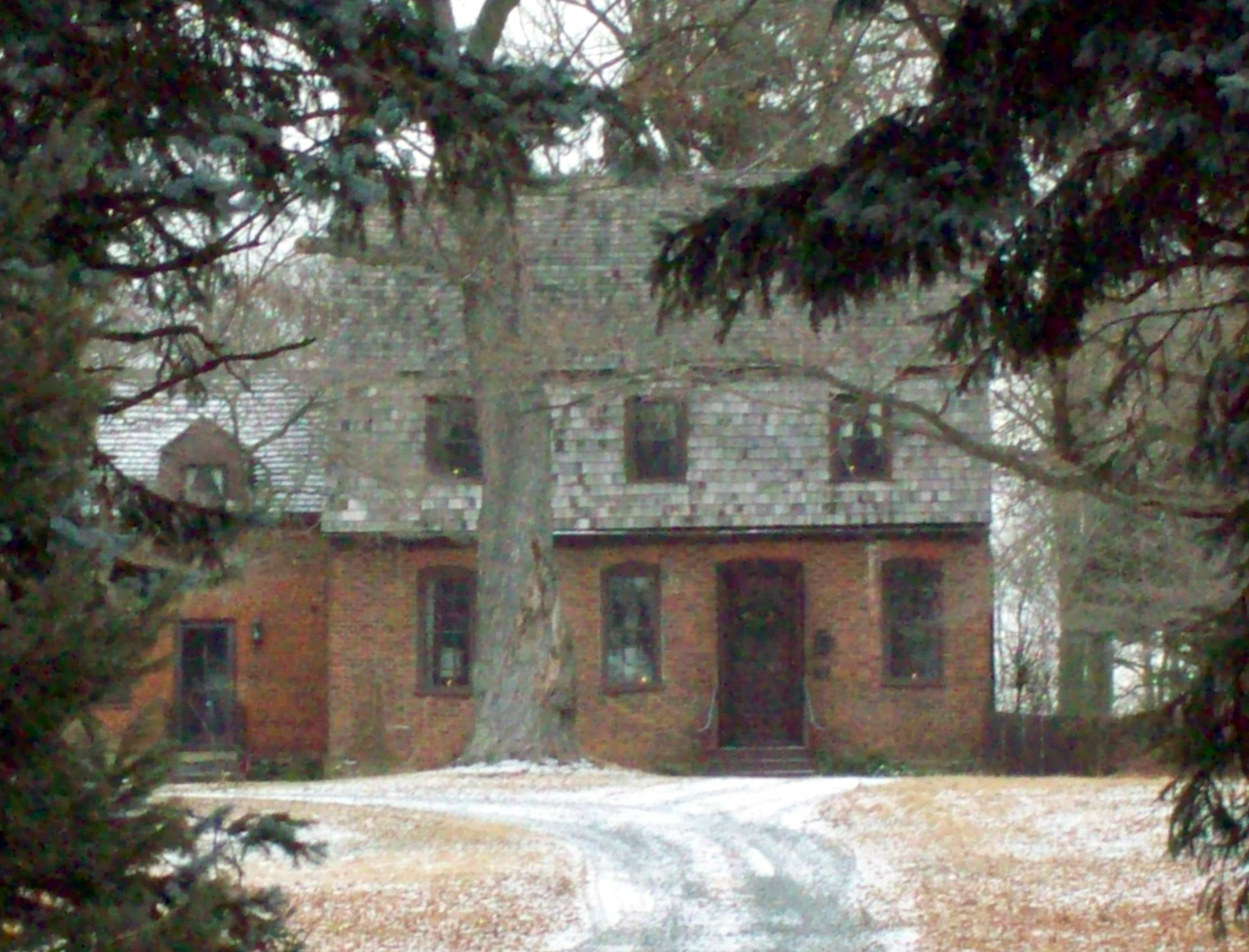
- Clifton, January 2011

- Location within Maryland Location within the United States
- Location: 17107 New Hampshire Ave, Ednor, Maryland
- Coordinates: 39°8′17″N 76°59′39″W
- Area: 20 acres (8.1 ha)
- Built: 1742
- NRHP reference No.: 74000959
- Added to NRHP: June 25, 1974

Clifton is a historic home located at Ednor, Montgomery County, Maryland, United States. It is a 1 1/2-story gambrel-roofed brick structure with a lower north wing, also with a gambrel roof. Outbuildings on the property include a wood-frame shed and a guest house or cottage. It is one of the few extant mid-18th-century buildings in Montgomery County and is associated with the local Quaker community, which by 1753 had been organized into the Sandy Spring Meeting of Friends.

Clifton was listed on the National Register of Historic Places in 1974.
