= Selden Island =

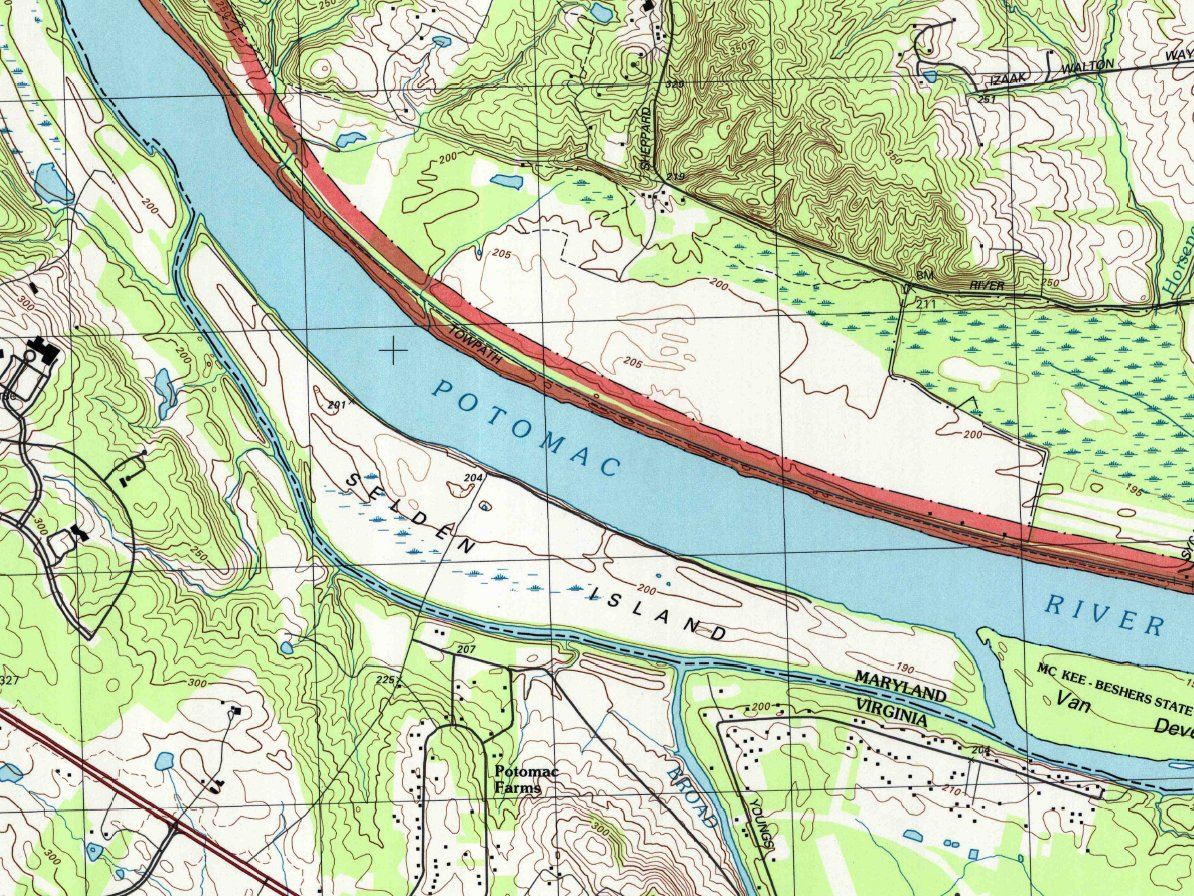
- USGS map of Selden Island

- Selden Island (Maryland)

Geography
- Location: Potomac River
- Coordinates: 39°04′31″N 77°27′10″W
- Area: 408 acres (165 ha)
- Length: 4.0 km (2.49 mi)
- Width: 0.3–0.5 km (0.19–0.31 mi)
- Highest elevation: 65 m (213 ft)

Administration
- United States
- State: Maryland
- County: Montgomery

Demographics
- Population: 0 (2022)

Selden Island is a 408-acre island in the Potomac River, located about 32 km (20 mi) WNW of Washington, D.C., United States. It is about 4 kilometres (2.5 mi) long and 0.4–0.5 kilometres (0.25–0.31 mi) wide. Although it is located within Montgomery County, Maryland, the only road access is via a bridge connecting it to the Loudoun County, Virginia side of the river.

Archaeological evidence indicates the island has been a site of human activity since the Early Woodland period, around 1000 BC. A characteristic type of pottery known as Selden Island ware dated from this period. It is also the site of a significant Late Woodland period settlement known as the Walker Prehistoric Village, which was added to the National Register of Historic Places in 1975.

In 2002, following the diagnosis of two Loudoun County teenagers with malaria, mosquitoes from the island were found to carry the Plasmodium vivax malarial parasite.

In 2004, Selden Island was purchased by the Howard Hughes Medical Institute as an addition to the Janelia Farm Research Campus. It was formerly leased as a sod farm.
