= Hanover Airport (disambiguation) =

Hannover Airport is the international airport of Hanover, Germany. (IATA: HAJ, ICAO: EDDV)

Hanover Airport may refer to:

- Hanover County Municipal Airport in Hanover County, Virginia, United States (FAA: OFP; ICAO: KOFP)
- Hanover Saugeen Airport, in Hanover, Ontario, Canada (CPN4)
- Hanover Airport, in Hanover, Pennsylvania, United States (FAA: 6W6)
