= Hanover (automobile) =

Defunct American motor vehicle manufacturer

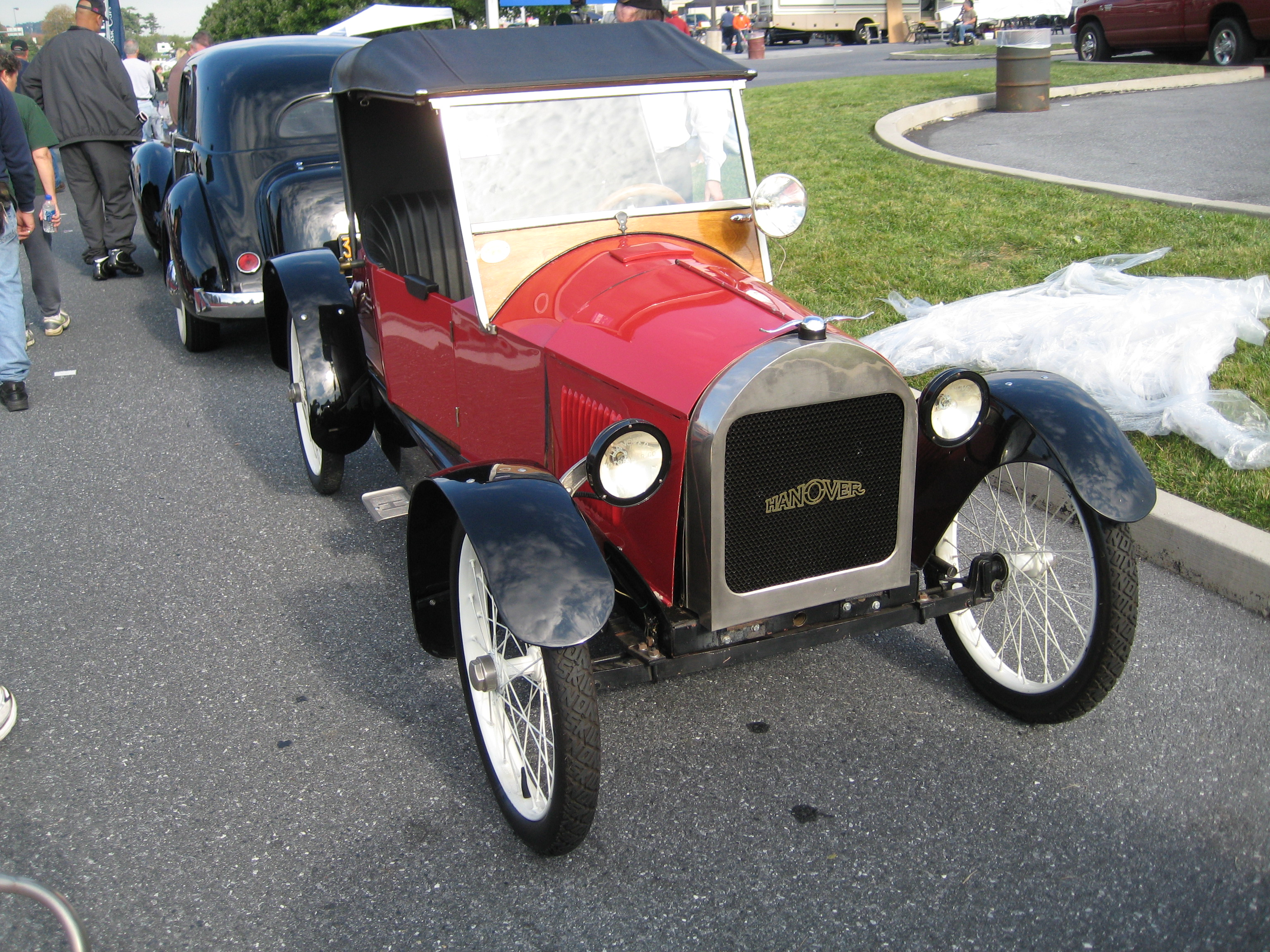
Hanover automobile

The Hanover Motor Car Company was an American automobile manufacturer located in Hanover, Pennsylvania and Buffalo, New York. The company was established in 1921 in Hanover. At this first location, roughly 158 cyclecars were built between 1921 and 1922, after which time production of the cars themselves moved to Buffalo and the Hanover plant continued to produce components and replacement parts. Some sources indicated that approximately 800 Hanover cars were built between 1921 and 1927.

The Hanover car was available either as a two-seater roadster ($345) or as a two-seater delivery truck ($370). All versions had a pressed-steel frame, and were powered by an air-cooled, 76.5 cubic-inch V-Twin motor capable of producing 12.5 horsepower. Final drive was achieved through a two speed manual transmission (with reverse) coupled to a solid rear axle. Lacking a proper differential, which saved costs, the cars were somewhat notorious for "hopping" around corners. The design was further simplified to a point where it was very easy for the manufacturer to convert the cars from left-hand drive to right-hand drive for export markets. The majority of the vehicles were exported to Japan. The Hanover Motor Company promised fuel economy of approximately 49 miles to the gallon, and guaranteed the factory-supplied tires were capable of lasting up to 20,000 miles. The Hanover car had electric headlights, but relied on a crank starter. It also had no windows and minimal space for the driver and passenger.

Unfortunately, the cost-saving measures taken in the design of the car meant that by the standards of the mid-1920s it was already outdated. For slightly more money, one could purchase a Ford Model T. Sales slumped in 1927 and the Hanover Motor Company went out of business at the end of that year. Today, very few Hanover cars survive. Most extant vehicles are located in museums or private collections.

== Model ==
| Model | Dates of Manufacture | Engine | Output | Wheelbase | Body Style |
|---|---|---|---|---|---|
| Light Car | 1921–1927 | V2 | 12.5 hp | 7 ft, 6in | 2-seat Roadster, 2-seat Delivery Truck |
