= Rockville Park Historic District =

Historic district in Maryland, United States

- U.S. National Register of Historic Places
- U.S. Historic district
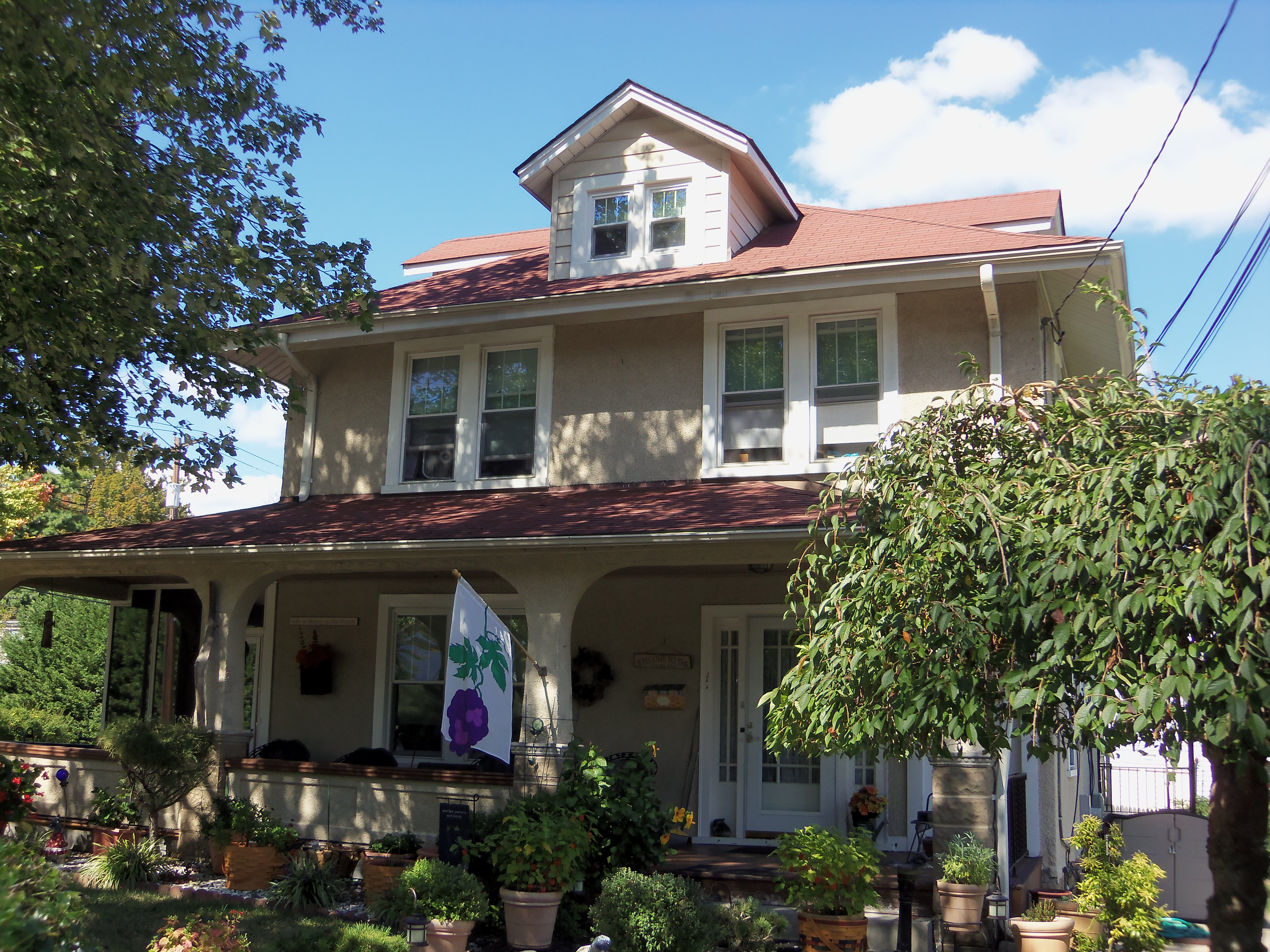
- Rockville Park Historic District, September 2012

- Location within Maryland Location within the United States
- Location: Roughly bounded by Baltimore Rd., Joseph St., Grandin, Reading, & S. Stonestreet Aves., Rockville, Maryland
- Coordinates: 39°4′55″N 77°8′23″W
- Architectural style: Victorian, American Foursquare, bungalow, and Minimal Traditional
- NRHP reference No.: 11000962
- Added to NRHP: December 30, 2011

The Rockville Park Historic District is a national historic district in Rockville, Montgomery County, Maryland. The neighborhood was platted in 1884 along the B&O Railroad Metropolitan Branch. It is associated with the suburban development of Rockville with the extension of the railroad in 1873 and increased middle-class home ownership in the late 19th century. Its northern boundary is Baltimore Road, which is one of Montgomery County's historic roads. Three early developers of the district include William Reading, Washington Danenhower, and Joseph Reading. It is home to a diversity of residential forms and architectural styles, including Victorian, American Foursquare, bungalow, and Minimal Traditional houses from the 1950s.
