= East Oaks =

Historic house in Maryland, United States

- U.S. National Register of Historic Places
- U.S. Historic district
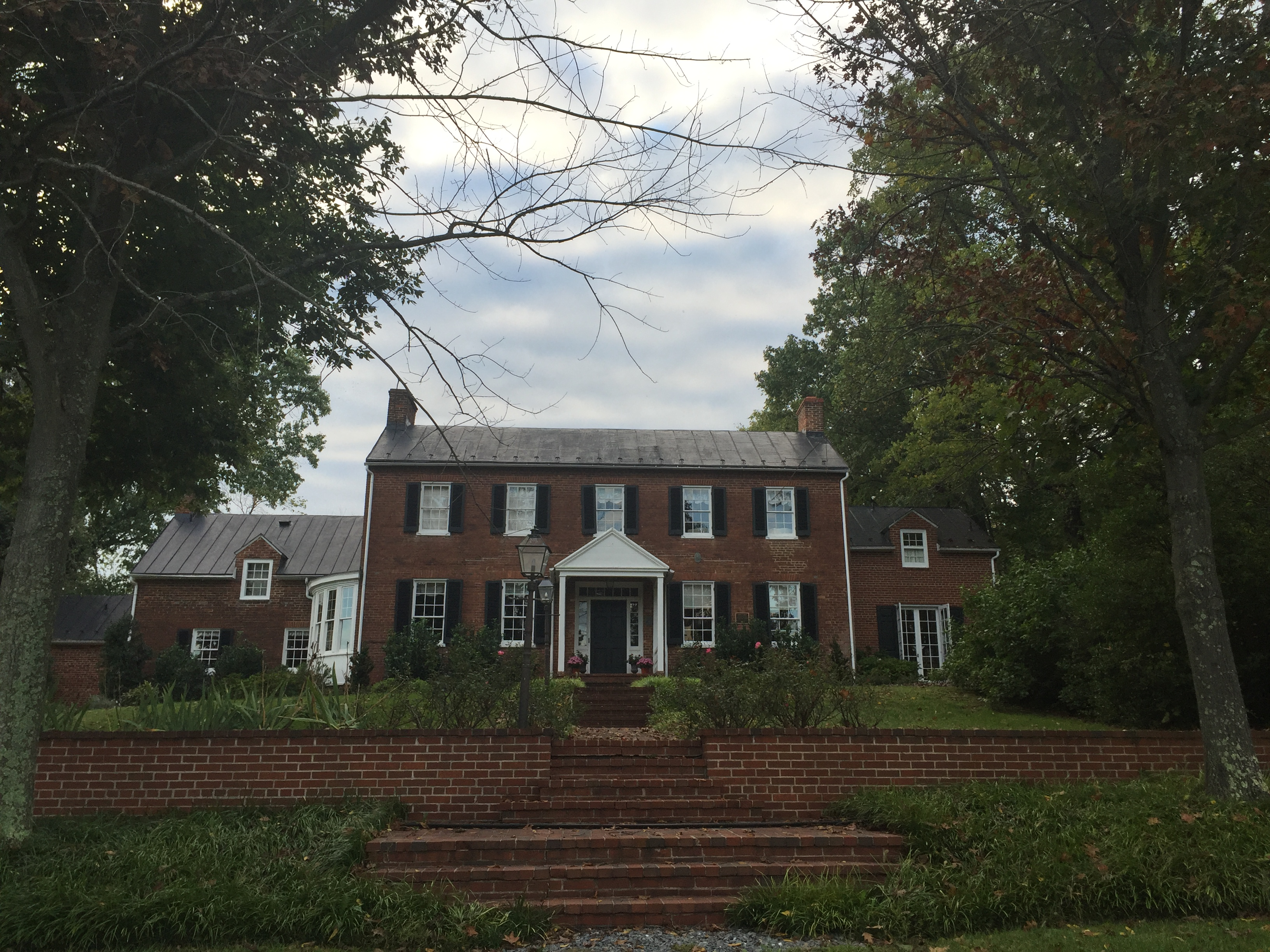

- Location within Maryland Location within the United States
- Nearest city: 21524 White's Ferry Road (MD 107), Poolesville, Maryland
- Coordinates: 39°09′13″N 77°27′03″W
- Area: 156.6 acres (63.4 ha)
- Built: 1829
- Architectural style: Federal
- NRHP reference No.: 96001168
- Added to NRHP: October 18, 1996

East Oaks is a historic home and farm complex and national historic district located at Poolesville, Montgomery County, Maryland. It is a 156-acre (0.63 km^{2}) farm complex consisting of a 2 1/2-story, c. 1829 Federal-period brick residence situated on a knoll surrounded by agricultural buildings and dependencies whose construction dates span more than a century. The complex of domestic and agricultural outbuildings includes a brick smokehouse, sandstone slave quarter, stone bank barn, stone dairy, and log and frame tenant house which are contemporaneous with the construction of the main dwelling. Other agricultural buildings include a small frame barn and machinery shed/corn crib from the end of the 19th century, and a block dairy barn from the mid 20th century.

It was listed on the National Register of Historic Places in 1996.
