= Walker Prehistoric Village Archeological Site =

- U.S. National Register of Historic Places
- Location: Address Restricted
- Nearest city: Poolesville, Maryland
- NRHP reference No.: 75000914
- Added to NRHP: May 12, 1975

Walker Prehistoric Village Archeological Site is an archeological site located near Poolesville, Montgomery County, Maryland. The site is a large Late Woodland village located on Selden Island in the Potomac River. Excavations carried out in the 1930s and 1940s revealed a 40-foot section of a palisade, circular house patterns, shallow oval pits and cylindrical pits, and flexed burials interred in the floors of the houses.

The island lends its name to a characteristic Early Woodland period ceramic ware known as Selden Island ware, dating from 1000 – 750 BCE and distributed from Virginia to Delaware and southeastern Pennsylvania including Maryland's piedmont and coastal plain.

The archaeological site was listed on the National Register of Historic Places in 1975.
