= Milton (Bethesda, Maryland) =

Historic house in Maryland, United States

- U.S. National Register of Historic Places
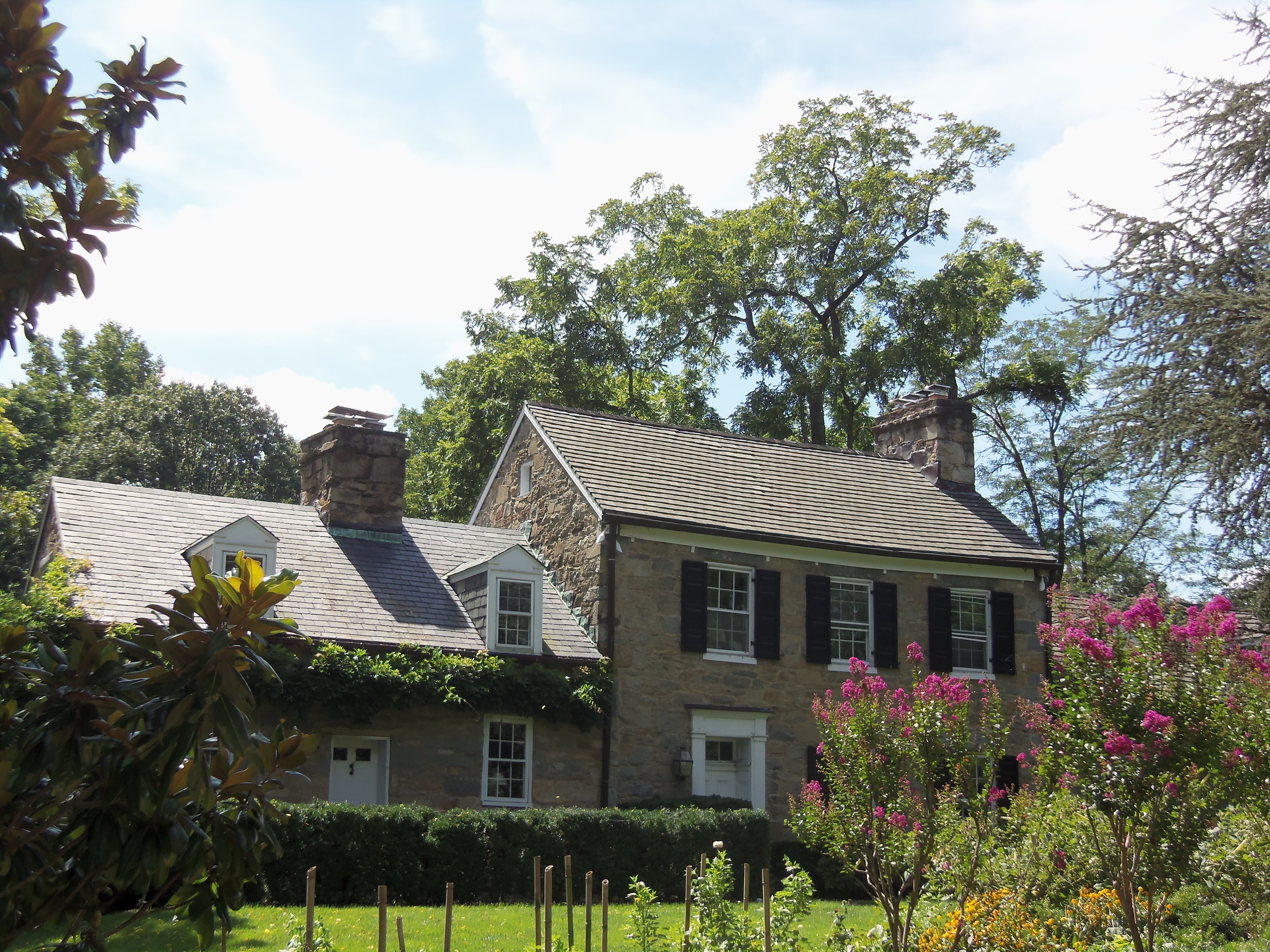
- Milton, August 2012

- Location within Maryland Location within the United States
- Location: 5312 Allendale Rd., Bethesda, Maryland
- Coordinates: 38°57′35″N 77°6′11″W
- Area: less than one acre
- Built: 1847
- NRHP reference No.: 75000908
- Added to NRHP: September 25, 1975

Milton, also known as the Loughborough House, is a historic home in Bethesda, Montgomery County, Maryland, United States. Made of uncoursed granite, it consists of the original one-and-a-half-story section built before 1820 and a two-story three-bay structure added in 1847. Outbuildings include a square stone smokehouse with a square hipped roof and a 19th-century stone ice house. It was the home of Nathan Loughborough, Comptroller of the Treasury during the John Adams administration. From 1934 until the 1970s, the house was owned by agricultural economist Mordecai J. Ezekiel.

Milton was listed on the National Register of Historic Places in 1975.
