= Mount Nebo Archaeological District =

Archaeological site in Ohio, United States

- Mt. Nebo Archeological District
- U.S. National Register of Historic Places
- U.S. Historic district
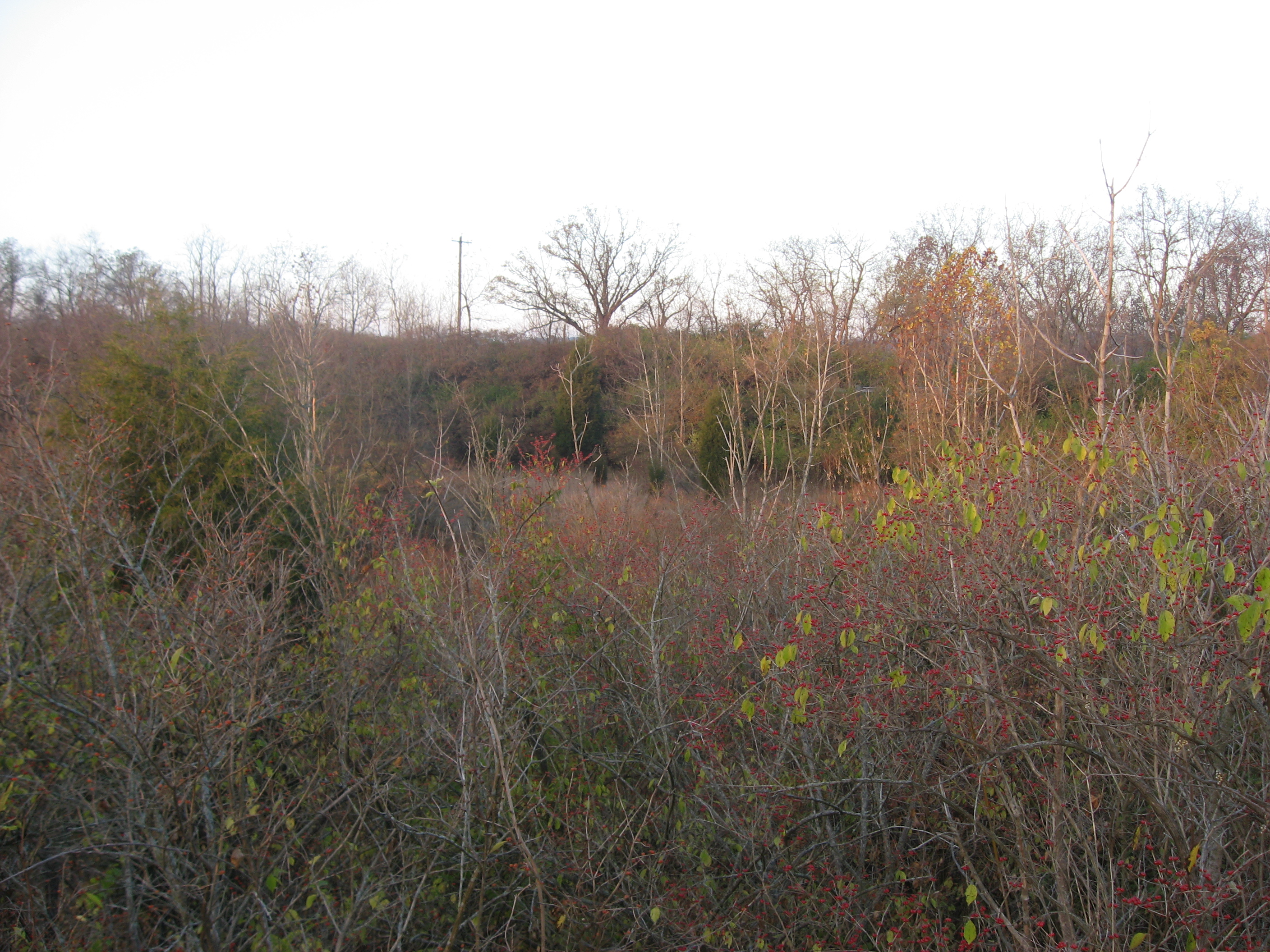
- Fields in the district

- Location within Ohio Location within the United States
- Location: Junction of Mt. Nebo and Brower Rds.
- Nearest city: North Bend, Ohio
- Coordinates: 39°8′57″N 84°47′42″W
- Area: 40 acres (16 ha)
- NRHP reference No.: 75001435
- Added to NRHP: March 3, 1975

The Mount Nebo Archaeological District is a historic district in the southwestern corner of the U.S. state of Ohio. Located near North Bend, the district lies near the intersection of Mount Nebo and Brower Roads. Included in the district's 40 acres (16 ha) of area are two contributing properties: one large archaeological site and one Native American mound.

The southwestern corner of Hamilton County contains many archaeological sites, including nearly fifty in the nearby Shawnee Lookout Archeological District. This part of the state was heavily frequented in the pre-Columbian era because its countryside was highly favorable for human habitation: the Ohio and Miami Rivers provide good transportation; the land is fertile; and abundant food can be found.

Mount Nebo has gained a reputation as one of the most valuable archaeological sites in southwestern Ohio. Local amateur archaeologists have frequented the area, as large numbers of artifacts can be found on the surface of the ground. Among the findings are artifacts both of the Archaic and Woodland periods, thousands of years apart from each other. In recognition of its archaeological value, the Mount Nebo Archaeological District was listed on the National Register of Historic Places in 1975, approximately three months after the district on Shawnee Lookout.
