= Hanover Street =

Hanover Street may refer to:

- a street in central London, United Kingdom, going from Regent Street to Hanover Square, London
  - Hanover Street (film), a 1979 World War II film, named after the London street
- Hanover Street, Baltimore, Maryland, part of Maryland Route 2
- Hanover Street (Boston), Massachusetts
- a major street in the New Town, Edinburgh
- a major street in Liverpool
- a street in Cork City, Ireland
