= Ednor, Maryland =

Unincorporated community in Maryland, U.S.

Coordinates: 39°08′09″N 76°59′42″W

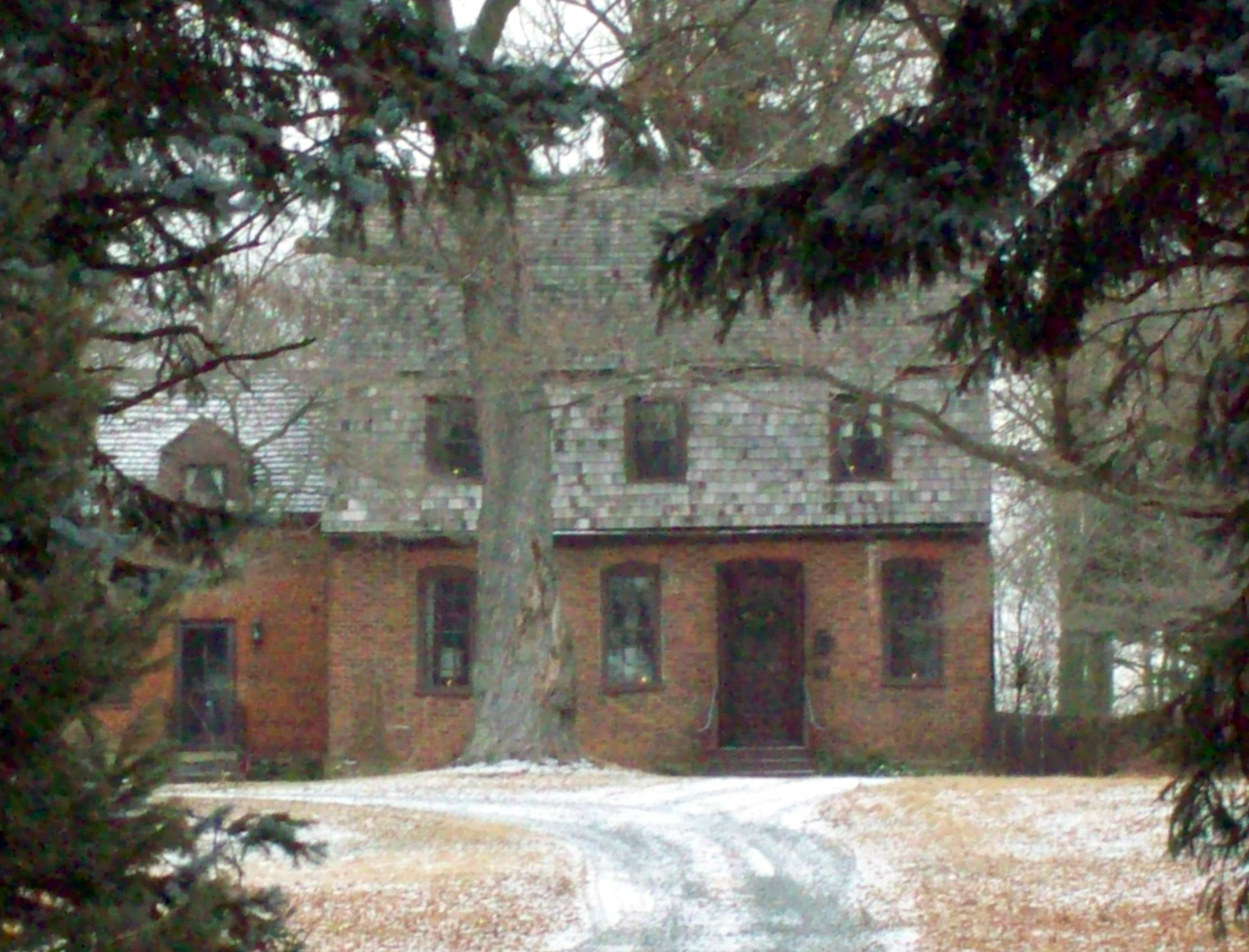
The historic Clifton house, built in 1742

Ednor is an unincorporated community in Montgomery County, Maryland, United States.

Ednor had a school as early as 1893 and a post office as early as 1895.
