= Old Chiswell Place =

Historic house in Maryland, United States

- U.S. National Register of Historic Places
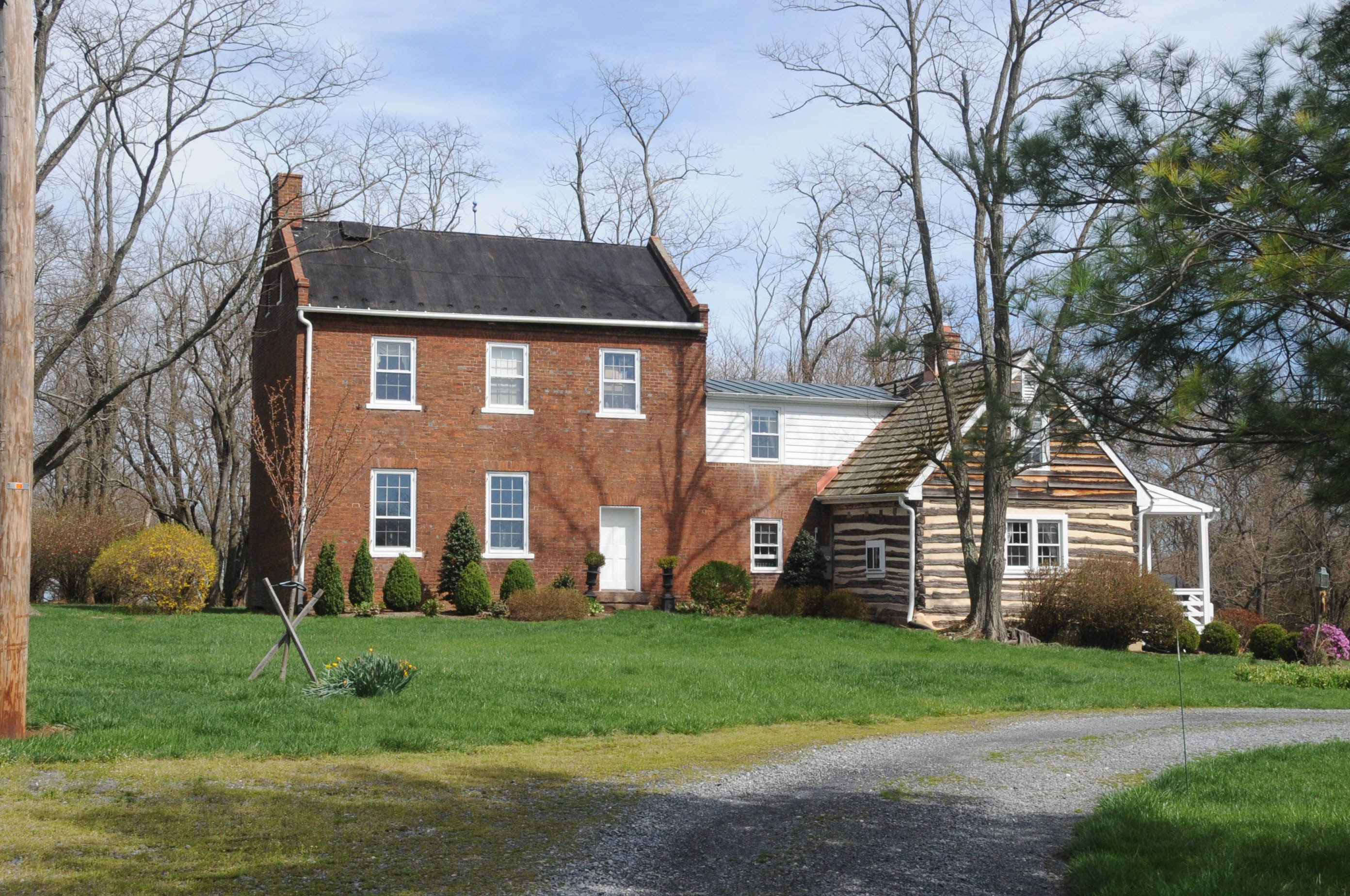

- Location within Maryland Location within the United States
- Location: 18125 Cattail Road, Poolesville, Maryland
- Coordinates: 39°9′1″N 77°23′18″W
- Area: 145 acres (59 ha)
- Built: 1790
- Architectural style: Federal, Log House
- NRHP reference No.: 75000912
- Added to NRHP: September 9, 1975

The Old Chiswell Place, also known as Blue Plains, is a historic home and property located at Poolesville, Montgomery County, Maryland. The home is a frame, log, and brick structure built in three stages. In addition to the residence, there is a meathouse of log with an attached springhouse. There is a small log house probably used for storage with sandstone chips used between the logs. There is also an early corncrib made of frame and logs. It has the further significance of having been the home of three men distinguished in their period. George Frazier Magruder bought this farm in 1778 and moved from neighboring Prince George's County where he had been a fourth generation resident and planter.

It was listed on the National Register of Historic Places in 1975.
