= Mount Nebo, Preston County, West Virginia =

Mount Nebo, West Virginia
- Unincorporated community
- Location within West Virginia Location within the United States
- Coordinates: 39°36′08″N 79°42′28″W
- Country: United States
- State: West Virginia
- County: Preston
- Elevation: 1,696 ft (517 m)
- Time zone: UTC-5 (Eastern (EST))
  - Summer (DST): UTC-4 (EDT)
- Area codes: 304 & 681
- GNIS feature ID: 1558611

Mount Nebo is an unincorporated community in Preston County, West Virginia, United States. Mount Nebo is 13 miles (21 km) east of Morgantown.
