= Clarksburg School (Clarksburg, Maryland) =

Historic building in Maryland, United States

- U.S. National Register of Historic Places
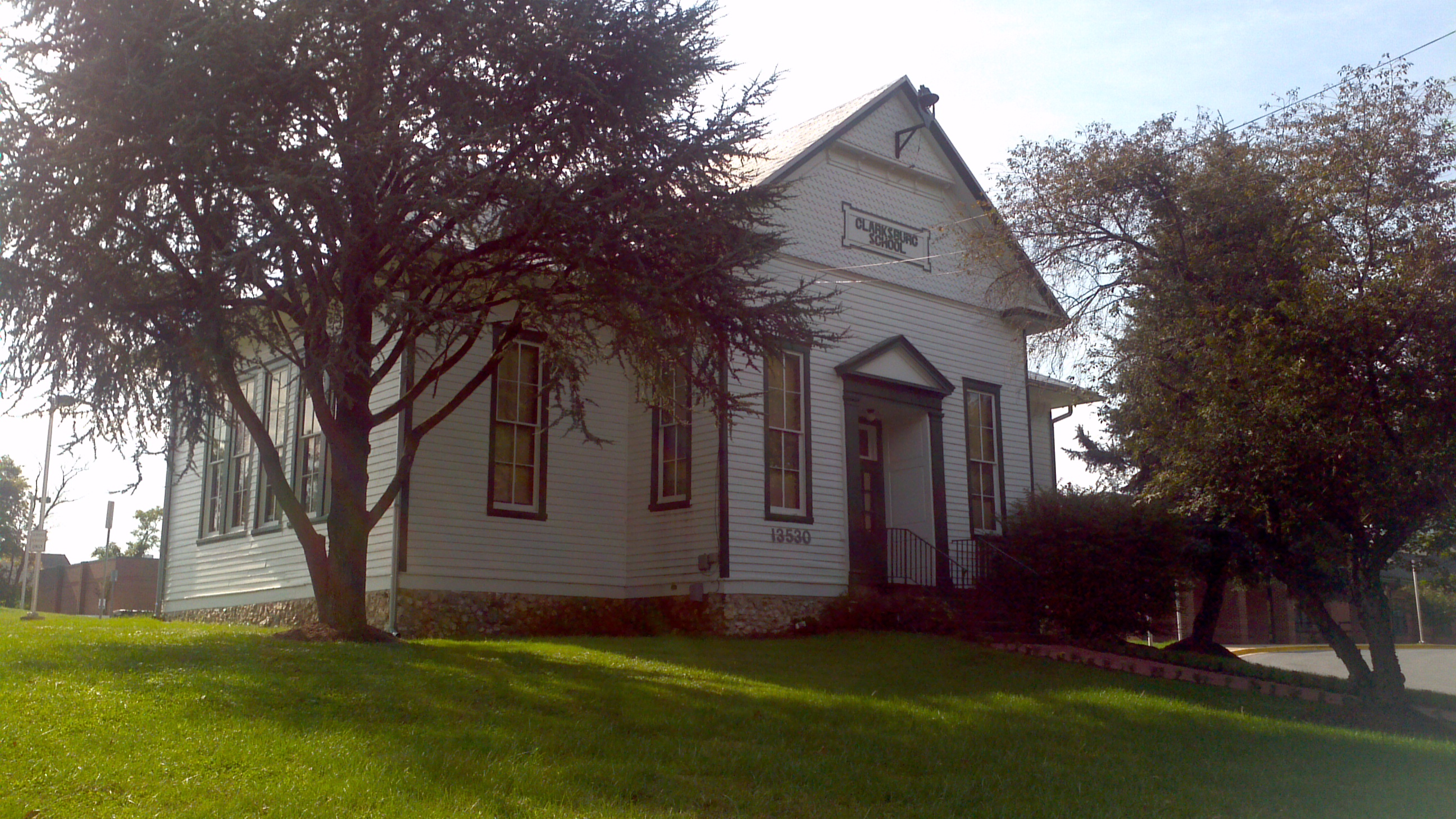

- Location within Maryland Location within the United States
- Location: 13530 Redgrave Place, Clarksburg, Maryland
- Coordinates: 39°14′14″N 77°16′52″W
- Area: less than one acre
- Built: 1909
- NRHP reference No.: 75000909
- Added to NRHP: February 20, 1975

The Clarksburg School is a historic building located at Clarksburg, Montgomery County, Maryland, United States. It is a rectangular frame structure with a prominent projecting porch on the main facade. It is the last remaining of four similar frame public school structures built shortly after the turn of the 20th century in Montgomery County and was in continuous service from 1909 to 1972.

The Clarksburg School was listed on the National Register of Historic Places in 1975.
