= Mount Nebo (Poolesville, Maryland) =

Historic house in Maryland, United States

- Mt. Nebo
- U.S. National Register of Historic Places
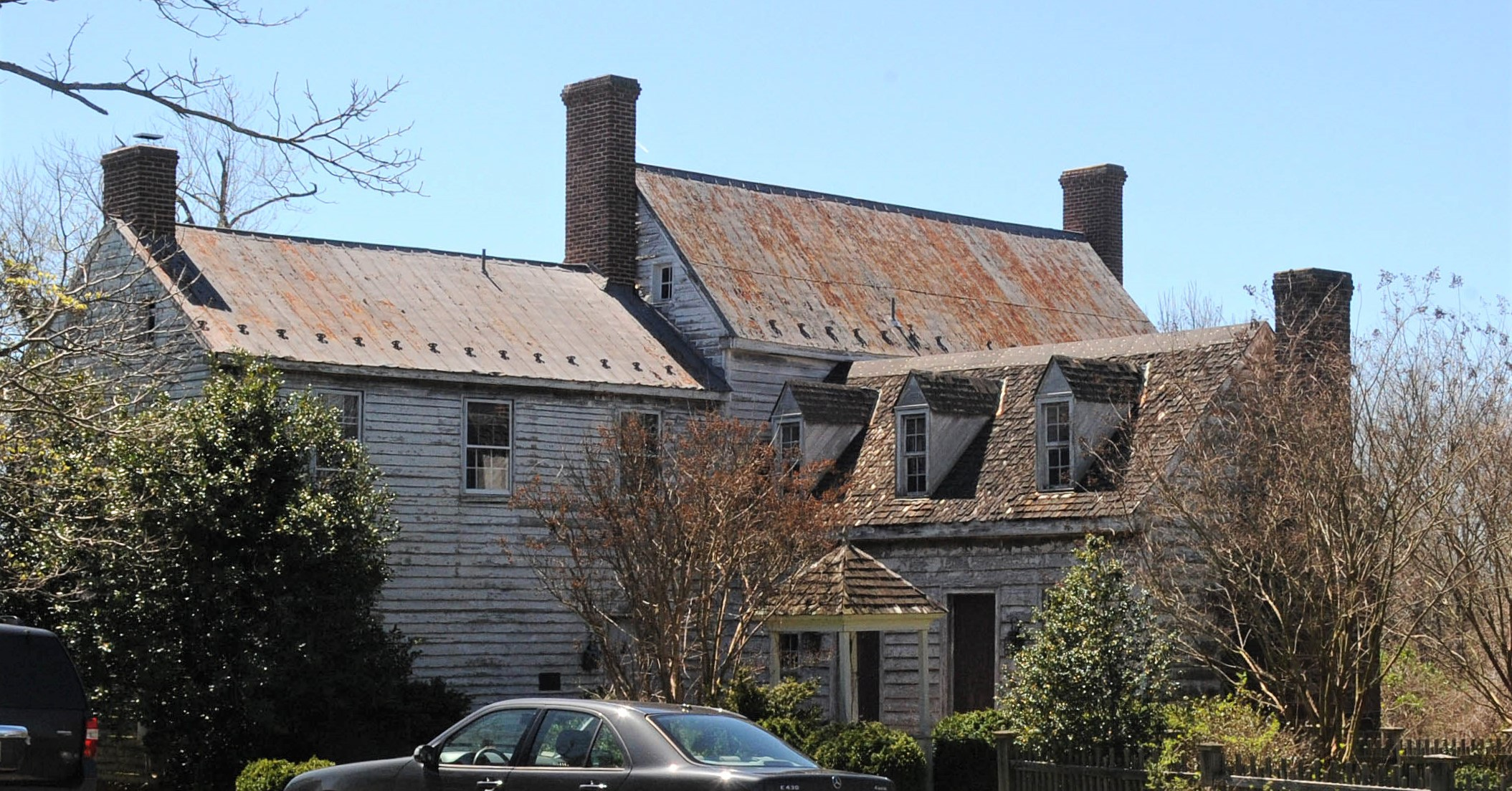

- Location within Maryland Location within the United States
- Location: 14510 Mt. Nebo Rd., Poolesville, Maryland
- Coordinates: 39°5′35″N 77°26′55″W
- Area: 3 acres (1.2 ha)
- NRHP reference No.: 85000653
- Added to NRHP: March 28, 1985

Mt. Nebo is a historic home located at Poolesville, Montgomery County, Maryland, United States. It is a large 2 1/2-story gable-roofed frame dwelling constructed in three periods: the main block, dating to the second quarter of the 19th century; a 1 1/2-story wing extends from the rear of the main block, which appears to have been an earlier dwelling from the late 18th century; and a two-story addition was made to the east gable end of the main block around the turn of the 20th century. Also on the property is a mid-19th-century log smokehouse and the remains of an early terraced "waterfall" garden. The property derives additional significance from its association with the White family through the latter half of the 19th century. Joseph White (1825–1903) was a locally prominent supporter of the Confederate cause during the American Civil War. Mt. Nebo was listed on the National Register of Historic Places in 1985.
