= Edward Beale House =

Historic house in Maryland, United States

- U.S. National Register of Historic Places
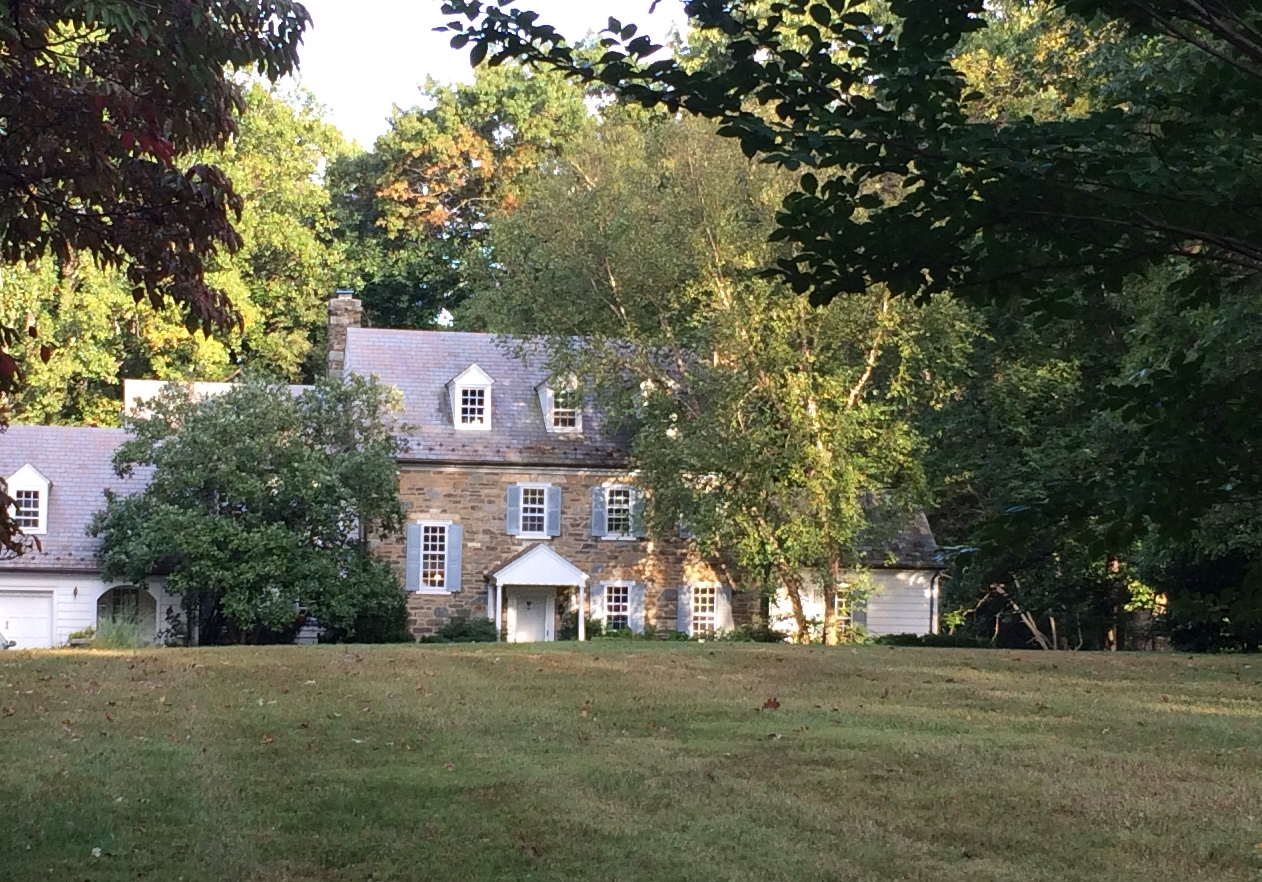

- Location within Maryland Location within the United States
- Location: 11011 Glen Rd., Potomac, Maryland
- Coordinates: 39°2′59″N 77°13′31″W
- Area: 6.5 acres (2.6 ha)
- Built: 1938
- Architect: Pope & Kruse
- Architectural style: Colonial Revival
- NRHP reference No.: 96000902
- Added to NRHP: August 16, 1996

The Edward Beale House is a historic home located at Potomac, Montgomery County, Maryland. It is a Colonial Revival residence built in 1938, and designed to look like a Pennsylvania farmhouse that has evolved over centuries. The 2 1/2-story house has a modified telescope form composed of stone and frame sections covered with side-gable slate shingle roofs. It was designed and built by Delaware architects Pope and Kruse.

It was listed on the National Register of Historic Places in 1996.
