= Mount Nebo (Minnesota) =

Hill in Minnesota, United States

Coordinates: 46°21′22″N 95°06′26″W

Mount Nebo is a morainic drift hill in sections 4 and 9 of Stowe Prairie Township in Todd County, Minnesota. This hill was named "for the peak east of the north end of the Dead Sea, from whence Moses viewed the Promised Land." Mount Nebo is located 2 miles north of Hewitt, Minnesota or 8 miles south of Wadena, Minnesota, in the northwest corner of Todd County. Mount Nebo has an elevation of 461 meters or 1,512 feet. Mount Nebo was site to a ski resort in the 1970s and 1980s until it was shut down. Currently Mount Nebo is site of an AT&T tower. The west side of Mount Nebo holds a wind turbine which is owned by a regional electric cooperative.
