= Annington (Poolesville, Maryland) =

Historic house in Maryland

- U.S. National Register of Historic Places
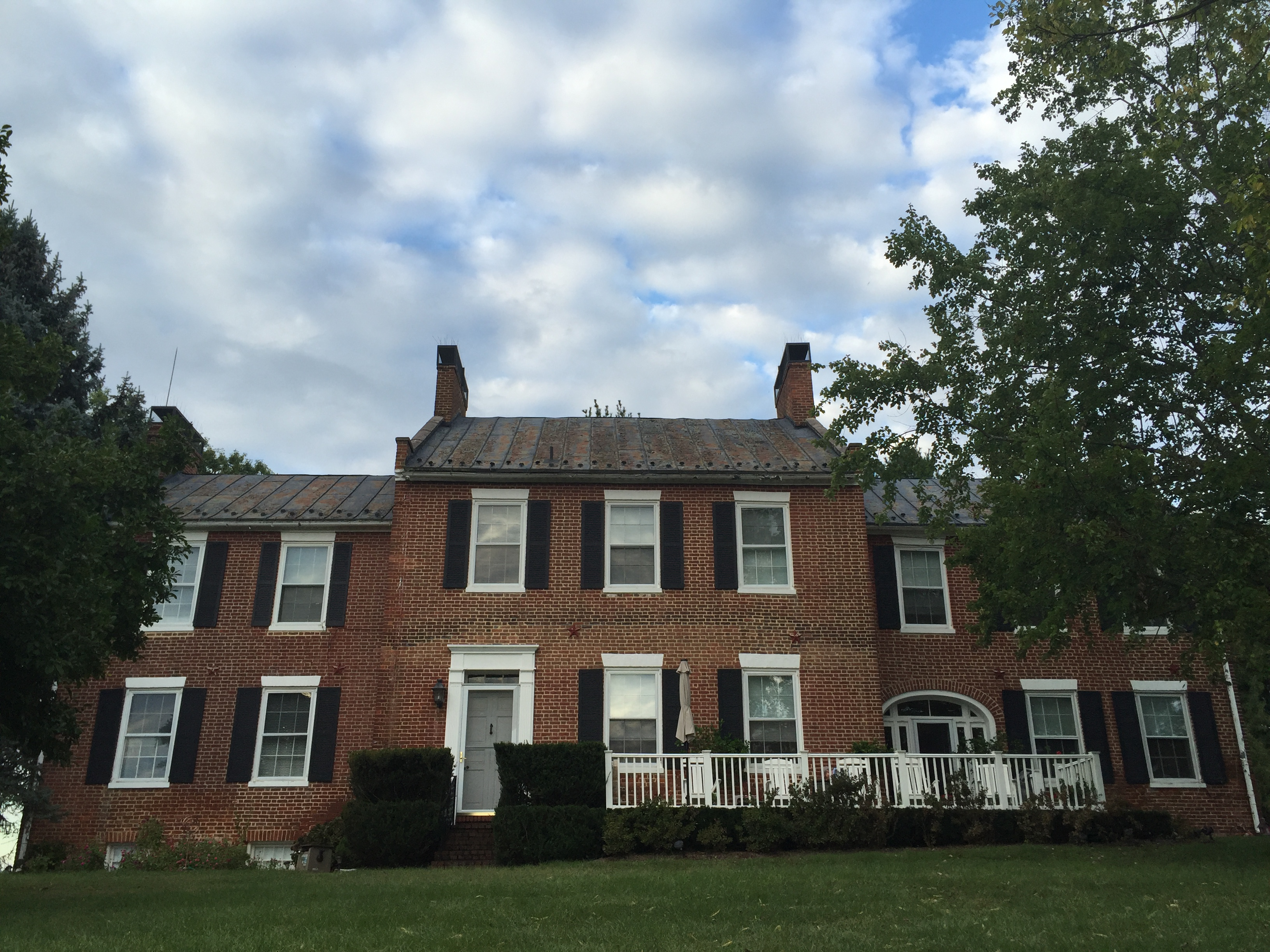

- Location within Maryland Location within the United States
- Location: 24001 White's Ferry Road, Poolesville, Maryland
- Coordinates: 39°10′6″N 77°30′8″W
- Area: 197 acres (80 ha)
- Built: 1813
- Architectural style: Georgian
- NRHP reference No.: 78001474
- Added to NRHP: December 11, 1978

Annington is a historic home located at Poolesville, Montgomery County, Maryland, United States. The house is constructed of brick, Flemish bond, consisting of three two-story sections: a main block three bays wide, a wing to the west two bays wide, and a wing to the east three bays wide. The house was built during the wheat boom of the early 1810s that the western counties of Maryland and nearby Virginia experienced with the opening of the Chesapeake and Ohio Canal. The Georgian house was built in about 1813, for Daniel Trundle, a planter, and member of the Maryland State Legislature for ten years. The site is a commanding one, overlooking the Potomac River, and during the American Civil War was a strategic lookout point and occupied by Union officers.

Annington was listed on the National Register of Historic Places in 1978.
