= Hanover Farm House =

Historic house in Maryland, United States

- U.S. National Register of Historic Places
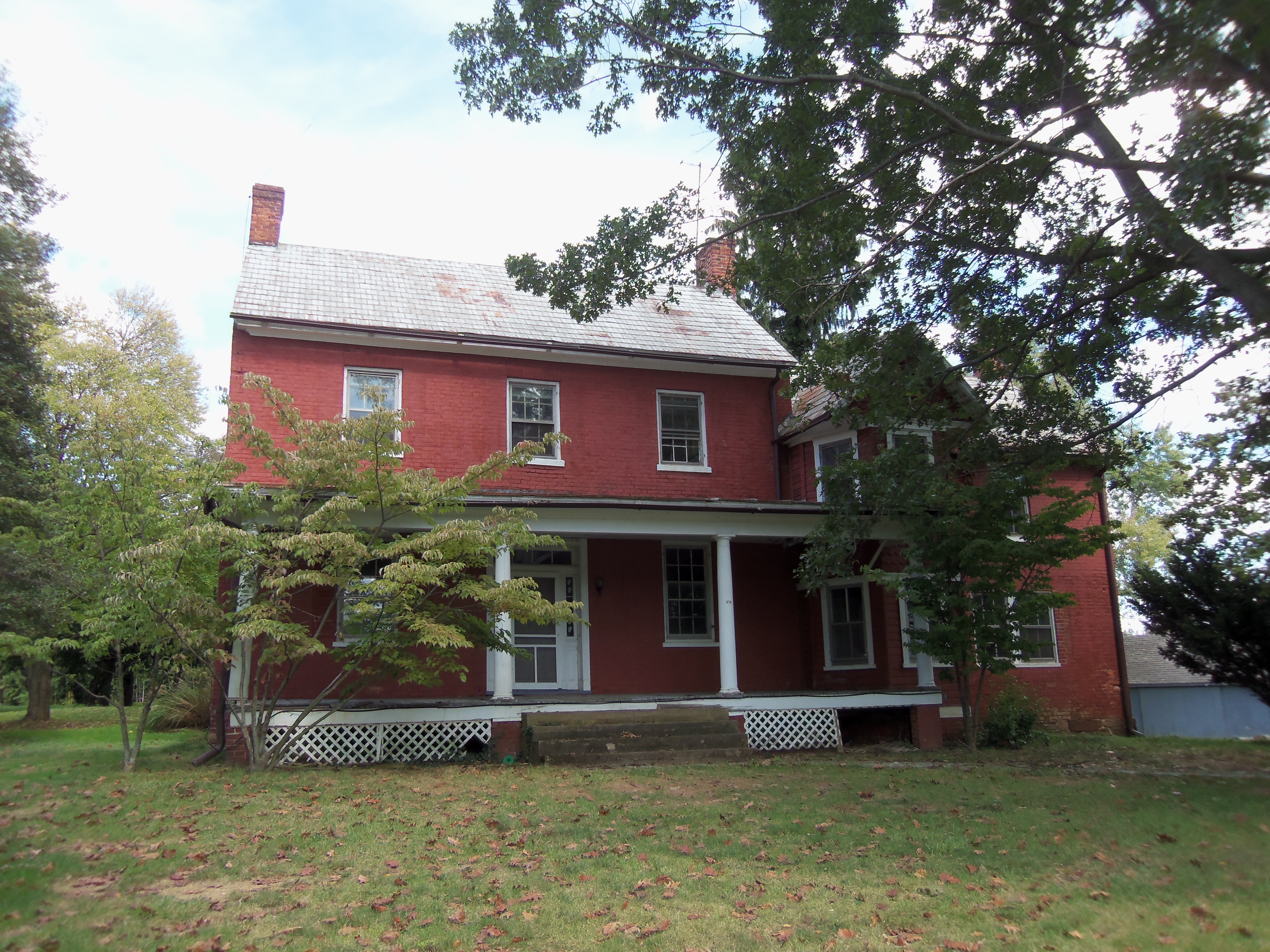
- Hanover Farm House, September 2012

- Location within Maryland Location within the United States
- Location: 19501 Darnestown Rd., Beallsville, Maryland
- Coordinates: 39°10′40″N 77°24′9″W
- Area: 5 acres (2.0 ha)
- Built: 1801
- Architectural style: Federal
- NRHP reference No.: 80001823
- Added to NRHP: August 6, 1980

The Hanover Farm House is a historic home located at Beallsville, Montgomery County, Maryland, United States. This brick house consists of a main block and kitchen wing dating to 1801–1804, and a 1 1/2-story modern kitchen wing added in 1954.

The Hanover Farm House was listed on the National Register of Historic Places in 1980.
