= List of tributaries of the Potomac River =

This is a complete list of tributary streams of the Potomac River in the Eastern United States, listed in order from source to mouth.

- North Branch Potomac River (Maryland/West Virginia)
- South Branch Potomac River (Virginia/West Virginia)
- Town Creek (Maryland/Pennsylvania)
- Big Run (Maryland)
- Little Cacapon River (West Virginia)
- Purslane Run (Maryland)
- Steer Run (West Virginia)
- Fifteenmile Creek (Maryland/Pennsylvania)
- Sideling Hill Creek (Maryland/Pennsylvania)
- Willett Run (West Virginia)
- Cacapon River (West Virginia)
- Sir Johns Run (West Virginia)
- Warm Spring Run (West Virginia)
- Tonoloway Creek (Maryland/Pennsylvania)
- Stoney Run (West Virginia)
- Ditch Run (West Virginia)
- Sleepy Creek (West Virginia)
- Licking Creek (Maryland/Pennsylvania)
- Big Run (West Virginia)
- Cherry Run (West Virginia)
- Back Creek (Virginia/West Virginia)
- Green Spring Run (Maryland)
- Harlan Run (West Virginia)
- Camp Spring Run (Maryland)
- Little Conococheague Creek (Maryland/Pennsylvania)
- Conococheague Creek (Maryland/Pennsylvania)
- Magruder Run (West Virginia)
- Opequon Creek (Virginia/West Virginia)
- Downey Branch (Maryland)
- Marsh Run (Maryland)
- Town Run (West Virginia)
- Rattlesnake Run (West Virginia)
- Antietam Creek (Maryland/Pennsylvania)
- Elks Run (West Virginia)
- Shenandoah River (Virginia/West Virginia)
- Piney Run (Virginia)
- Israel Creek (Maryland)
- Dutchman Creek (Virginia)
- Quarter Branch (Virginia)
- Little Catoctin Creek (Maryland)
- Catoctin Creek (Maryland)
- Catoctin Creek (Virginia)
- Tuscarora Creek (Maryland)
- Monocacy River (Maryland/Pennsylvania)
- Little Monocacy River (Maryland)
- Limestone Branch (Virginia)
- Broad Run (Maryland)
- Goose Creek (Virginia)
- Broad Run (Virginia)
- Horsepen Branch (Maryland)
- Sugarland Run (Virginia)
- Seneca Creek (Maryland)
- Old Sugarland Run (Virginia)
- Muddy Branch (Maryland)
- Nichols Run (Virginia)
- Watts Branch (Maryland)
- Limekiln Branch (Maryland)
- Carroll Branch (Maryland)
- Pond Run (Virginia)
- Clarks Branch (Virginia)
- Mine Run Branch (Virginia)
- Difficult Run (Virginia)
- Bullneck Run (Virginia)
- Rock Run (Maryland)
- Scott Run (Virginia)
- Dead Run (Virginia)
- Turkey Run (Virginia)
- Cabin John Creek (Maryland)
- Wisteria Run [unofficial name] (Virginia)
- Minnehaha Branch (Maryland)
- Little Falls Branch (Maryland)
- Pimmit Run (Virginia)
- Gulf Branch (Virginia)
- Donaldson Run (Virginia)
- Windy Run (Virginia)
- Spout Run (Virginia)
- Maddox Branch (District of Columbia)
- Foundry Branch (District of Columbia)
- Rock Creek (District of Columbia/Maryland)
- Rocky Run (Virginia) (paved over)
- Tiber Creek (District of Columbia) (paved over)
- Roaches Run (Virginia)
- Washington Channel (District of Columbia)
- Anacostia River (District of Columbia/Maryland)
- Four Mile Run (Virginia)
- Oxon Creek (District of Columbia/Maryland)
- Hunting Creek (Virginia)
- Broad Creek (Maryland)
- Henson Creek (Maryland)
- Swan Creek (Maryland)
- Piscataway Creek (Maryland)
- Little Hunting Creek (Virginia)
- Dogue Creek (Virginia)
- Accotink Creek (Virginia)
- Pohick Creek (Virginia)
- Pomonkey Creek (Maryland)
- Occoquan River (Virginia)
- Neabsco Creek (Virginia)
- Powells Creek (Virginia)
- Mattawoman Creek (Maryland)
- Chicamuxen Creek (Maryland)
- Quantico Creek (Virginia)
- Little Creek (Virginia)
- Chopawamsic Creek (Virginia)
- Tank Creek (Virginia)
- Aquia Creek (Virginia)
- Potomac Creek (Virginia)
- Nanjemoy Creek (Maryland)
- Port Tobacco River (Maryland)
- Popes Creek (Maryland)
- Gambo Creek (Virginia)
- Piccowaxen Creek (Maryland)
- Upper Machodoc Creek (Virginia)
- Cuckold Creek (Maryland)
- Wicomico River (Maryland)
- Monroe Creek (Virginia)
- Mattox Creek (Virginia)
- Popes Creek (Virginia)
- Nomini Creek (Virginia)
- Jackson Creek (Virginia)
- Bonum Creek (Virginia)
- St. Marys River (Maryland)
- Yeocomico River (Virginia)
- Garners Creek (Virginia)
- Coan River (Virginia)
- Cod Creek (Virginia)
- Presley Creek (Virginia)
- Hull Creek (Virginia)
- Cubitt Creek (Virginia)
- Hack Creek (Virginia)
