= List of Chesapeake Bay rivers =

This list of Chesapeake Bay rivers includes the main rivers draining into the Chesapeake Bay estuarine complex on the mid-Atlantic eastern coast of the United States, North America. The three largest rivers in order of both discharge and watershed area are the Susquehanna River, the Potomac River, and the James River. Other major rivers include the Rappahannock River, the Appomattox River (which flows into the lower James River), the York River (a combination of the Pamunkey and Mattaponi tributary rivers), the Patuxent River, and the Choptank River.

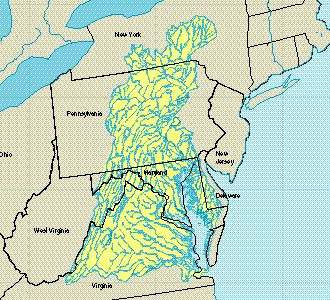
The Chesapeake Bay watershed

The entire Chesapeake Bay watershed includes portions of six states (New York, Pennsylvania, West Virginia, Maryland, Virginia, and Delaware) and the District of Columbia. The watershed of the entire Chesapeake Bay covers 165,760 km^{2} (approximately 64,000 mi^{2} or 41 million acres). With an estuary water body area of only 11,600 km^{2} (4,479 mi^{2}), the land-to-water ratio is about 14:1. Therefore, the rivers flowing into the Chesapeake Bay have a large influence on water quality in the estuary. The rivers flowing into the Chesapeake Bay act as sources of nutrients and sediments from land, which affect the health of the downstream estuary. The larger rivers cross the Atlantic seaboard fall line. Over time, many large cities emerged where these rivers cross the fall line as watermills allowed for the production of material goods. Colonial-era logging, farming, and later construction of mill dams have altered streams and trapped mud in much of the Chesapeake Bay watershed.

== Largest rivers ==
List of the seven largest Chesapeake Bay rivers
River	Mean annual flow (m^{3} s^{−1})	Watershed drainage area (km^{2})[2]
Susquehanna	1,145	70,189
Potomac	347	30,044
James^{[*]}	234	19,684
Rappahannock	49	4,144
York^{[**]}	43	4,331
Patuxent	11	901
Choptank	4	293

^{[*]} James values are the sums of flows and watershed areas of the James and Appomattox rivers. ^{[**]} York values are the sums of flows and watershed areas of the Mattaponi and Pamunkey tributary rivers.

== Other tributary rivers and tidal inlets ==
In addition to the largest rivers listed above, the following rivers drain directly into the Chesapeake Bay:

=== Eastern shore tributary rivers ===
- Pocomoke River
- Little Annemessex River
- Big Annemessex River
- Manokin River
- Monie Creek
- Wicomico River (Maryland eastern shore)
- Nanticoke River
- Transquaking River
- Blackwater River (Maryland)
- Honga River
- Little Choptank River
- Miles River
- Front River
- Wye River (Maryland)
- Chester River
- Sassafras River
- Elk River (Maryland)
- North East River
- Principio Creek

=== Western shore tributary rivers ===
- Swan Creek
- Romney Creek
- Bush River (Maryland)
- Gunpowder River
- Middle River (Maryland)
- Back River (Maryland)
- Patapsco River
- Magothy River
- Whitehall Creek (Maryland)
- Severn River (Maryland)
- South River (Maryland)
- West River (Maryland)
- Rhode River
- St. Marys River (Maryland)
- Little Wicomico River
- Great Wicomico River
- Piankatank River
- East River (Virginia)
- North River (Mobjack Bay)
- Ware River (Virginia)
- Severn River (Virginia)
- Poquoson River
- Back River (Virginia)
- Hampton River
- Elizabeth River (Virginia)
- Lynnhaven River

== See also ==
- Atlantic Seaboard Fall Line
- Atlantic seaboard watershed
- Chesapeake Bay
- Chesapeake Bay Program
- Chesapeake Bay Foundation
- Hydrology
- List of rivers of the United States
- List of rivers of Maryland
- List of rivers of Virginia
- Mid-Atlantic (United States)
- Mississippi River System
- Category:Tributaries of the Chesapeake Bay
