= List of rivers of Maryland =

List of rivers of Maryland (U.S. state).

The list is arranged by drainage basin from east to west, with respective tributaries indented under each larger stream's name and ordered from downstream to upstream.

== By drainage basin ==
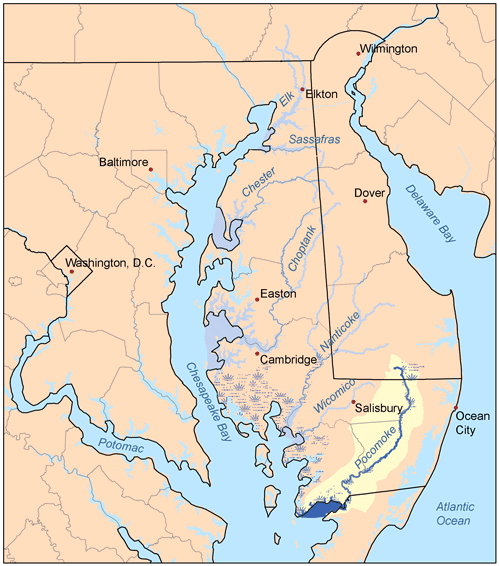
Pocomoke River watershed

=== Delaware River ===
- Christina River

=== Atlantic Ocean ===
- Ayres Creek
- Greys Creek
- St. Martin River
- Turville Creek
- Trappe Creek

=== Chesapeake Bay (Eastern Shore) ===
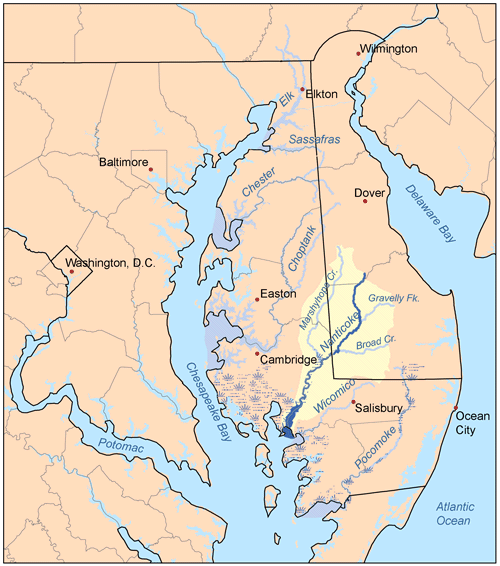
Nanticoke River watershed

- Pocomoke River
  - Marumsco Creek
  - Dividing Creek
  - Nassawango Creek
- Little Annemessex River
- Big Annemessex River
- Manokin River
- Monie Creek
- Wicomico River
  - Beaverdam Creek
- Nanticoke River
  - Barren Creek
    - Mockingbird Creek
  - Marshyhope Creek
    - Big Creek
    - Stony Bar Creek
    - Krafts Creek
    - Spears Creek
    - Becky Taylor Branch
    - Mill Branch
    - Mill Creek
    - Puckum Branch
    - Wrights Branch
    - Skinners Run
    - Davis Millpond Branch
      - North Davis Millpond Branch
      - South Davis Millpond Branch
    - Miles Branch
    - Tanyard Branch
    - Faulkner Branch
    - Tull Branch
    - Sullivan Branch
      - Raccoon Branch
      - Wolfpit Branch
  - Tommy Wright Branch
    - Smithville Ditch
- Transquaking River
  - Chicamacomico River
- Blackwater River
  - Little Blackwater River
  - Meekins Creek

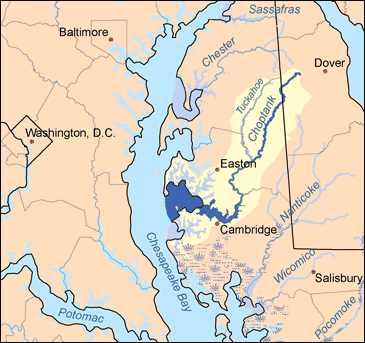
Choptank River watershed

- Honga River
- Little Choptank River
  - Slaughter Creek
  - Parsons Creek
  - Fishing Creek
- Choptank River
  - Harris Creek
  - Broad Creek
  - Tred Avon River
    - Town Creek
  - Warwick River
  - Tuckahoe Creek

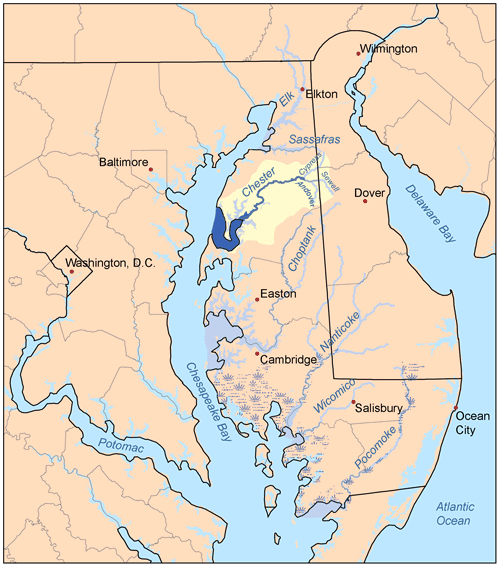
Chester River watershed

- Miles River
- Front River
- Wye River
  - Wye East River
- Chester River
  - Corsica River
  - Cypress Branch
  - Andover Branch
    - Sewell Branch
- Sassafras River
- Elk River
  - Bohemia River
  - Big Elk Creek
  - Little Elk Creek
- North East River
  - North East Creek
    - Little North East Creek
  - Stony Run
- Principio Creek
  - Mill Creek

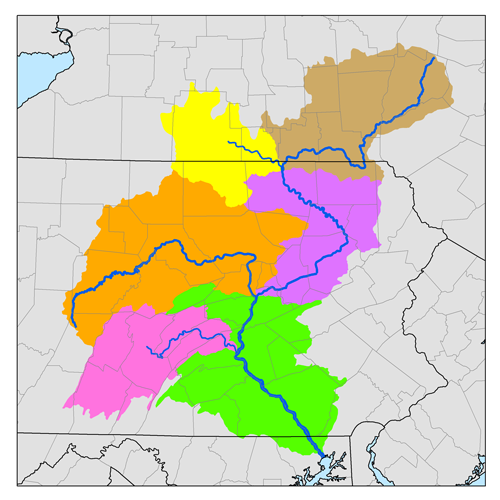
Susquehanna River watershed

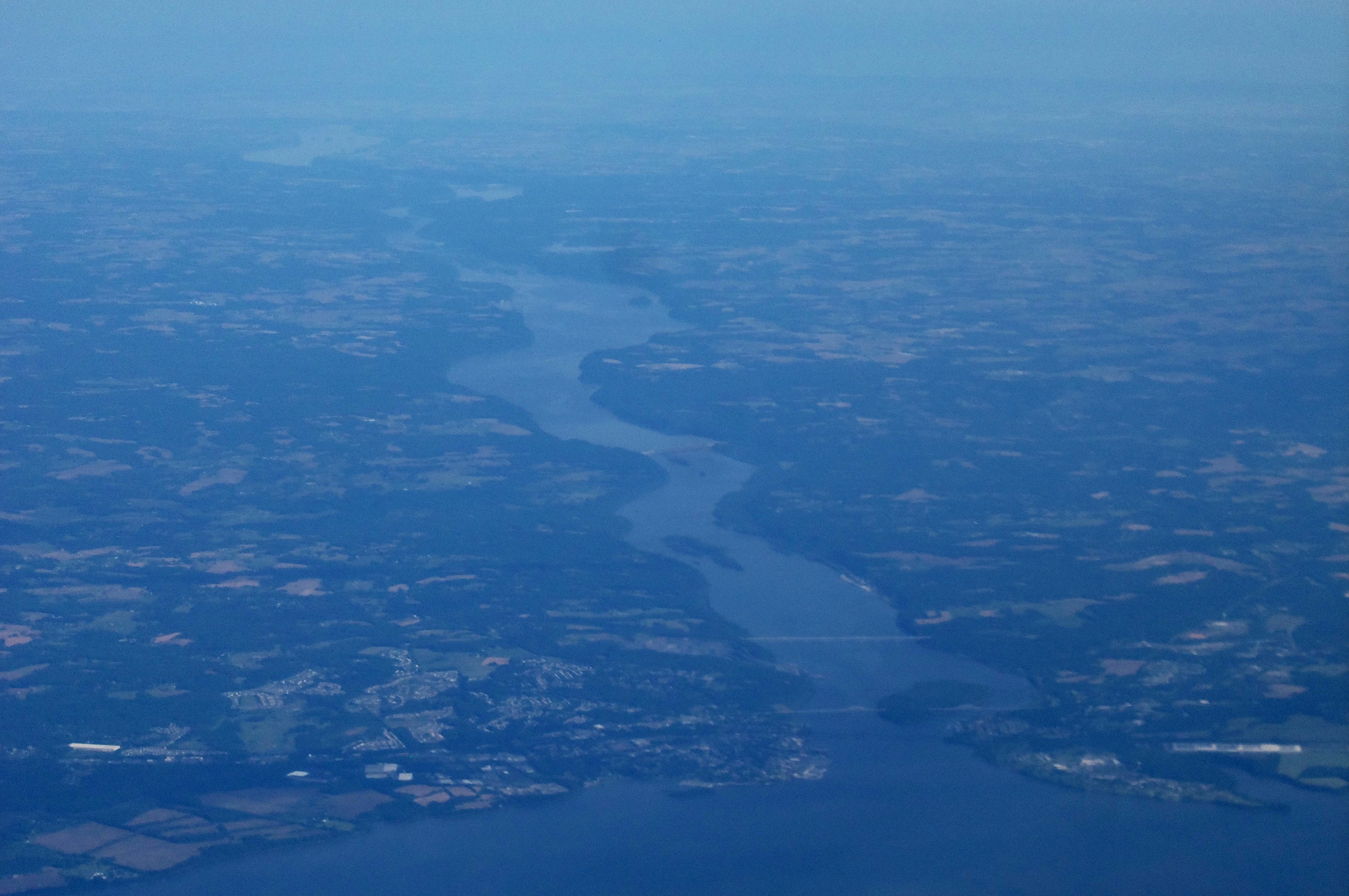
Oblique view of Susquehanna River in Maryland

=== Susquehanna River ===
- Susquehanna River
  - Deer Creek
  - Octoraro Creek
    - Basin Run
  - Conowingo Creek
  - Broad Creek

=== Chesapeake Bay Western Shore ===
- Swan Creek
  - Gasheys Creek
- Romney Creek
- Bush River
  - Otter Point Creek
    - Winters Run
  - Bush Creek
    - Bynum Run
    - James Run
  - Grays Run
  - Cranberry Run
- Gunpowder River
  - Saltpeter Creek
    - Dundee Creek
  - Bird River
    - Whitemarsh Run
  - Gunpowder Falls
    - Beaverdam Run
      - Western Run
        - McGill Run
        - Piney Run
      - Oregon Branch
    - Little Falls
    - Georges Run
  - Little Gunpowder Falls
- Middle River
  - Seneca Creek
  - Frog Mortar Creek
- Back River
  - Bread and Cheese Creek
  - Herring Run
  - Moores Run

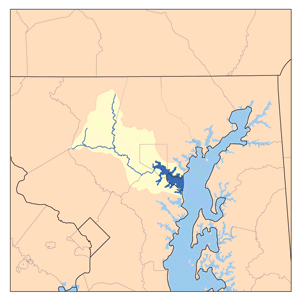
Patapsco River watershed

- Patapsco River
  - Bodkin Creek
    - Main Creek
  - Stony Creek
  - Bear Creek
  - Curtis Creek
    - Furnace Creek
    - Marley Creek
  - Northwest Branch Patapsco River
    - Jones Falls
      - Western Run
      - Towson Run
  - Middle Branch Patapsco River
    - Gwynns Falls
      - Dead Run
  - Main branch
    - Deep Run
    - Herbert Run
    - Tiber Branch
    - North Branch Patapsco River
      - Morgan Run
      - Middle Run
      - Beaver Run
    - South Branch Patapsco River
      - Piney Run
- Magothy River
  - Little Magothy River
- Severn River
- South River
  - North River

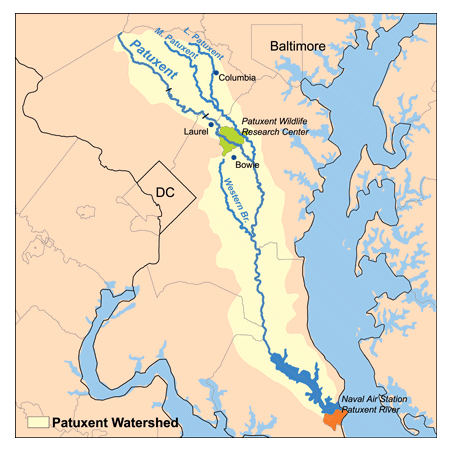
Patuxent River watershed

- West River
  - Rhode River
    - Bear Creek
    - Sellman Creek
- Patuxent River
  - Town Creek
  - Cuckold Creek
  - St. Leonard Creek
  - Indian Creek
  - Swanson Creek
  - Lyons Creek
  - Green Branch
  - Mill Branch
  - Western Branch Patuxent River
    - Collington Branch
  - Little Patuxent River
    - Middle Patuxent River
  - Hawlings River

=== Potomac River ===
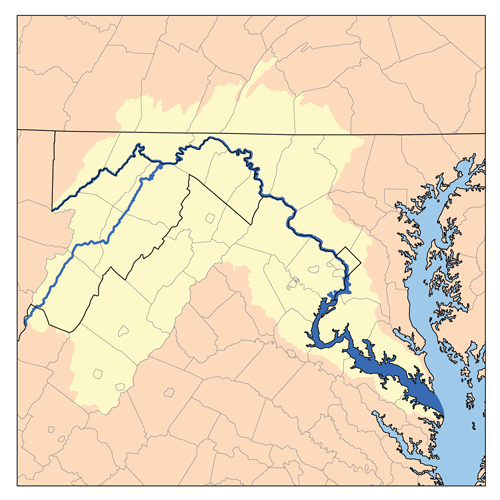
Potomac River watershed

- Potomac River
  - St. Marys River
    - St. George Creek
  - Difficult Run
  - Wicomico River
    - Budds Creek
  - Popes Creek
  - Port Tobacco River
  - Nanjemoy Creek
  - Chicamuxen Creek
  - Mattawoman Creek
  - Pomonkey Creek
  - Piscataway Creek
  - Broad Creek (see Broad Creek, Prince George's County, Maryland)
    - Henson Creek (see Broad Creek, Prince George's County, Maryland)
  - Oxon Creek
    - Oxon Run
  - Anacostia River
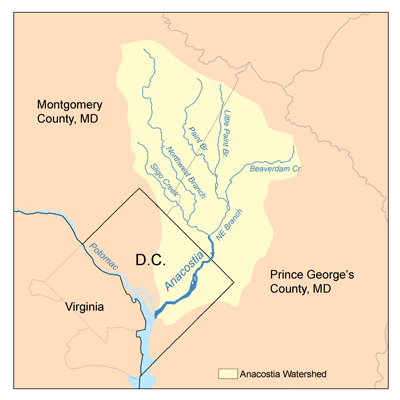
    Anacostia River watershed
    - Watts Branch (Anacostia River tributary)
    - Dueling Creek
    - Northeast Branch Anacostia River
      - Beaverdam Creek
      - Paint Branch
        - Little Paint Branch
      - Indian Creek (Anacostia River tributary)
    - Northwest Branch Anacostia River
      - Sligo Creek
  - Rock Creek
    - Coquelin Run
  - Little Falls Branch
  - Minnehaha Branch
  - Cabin John Creek
  - Rock Run
  - Carroll Branch
  - Limekiln Branch
  - Watts Branch (Potomac River tributary)
  - Muddy Branch
  - Seneca Creek
    - Dry Seneca Creek
    - Little Seneca Creek
      - Tenmile Creek
    - Great Seneca Creek
  - Horsepen Branch
  - Broad Run
  - Little Monocacy River
  - Monocacy River
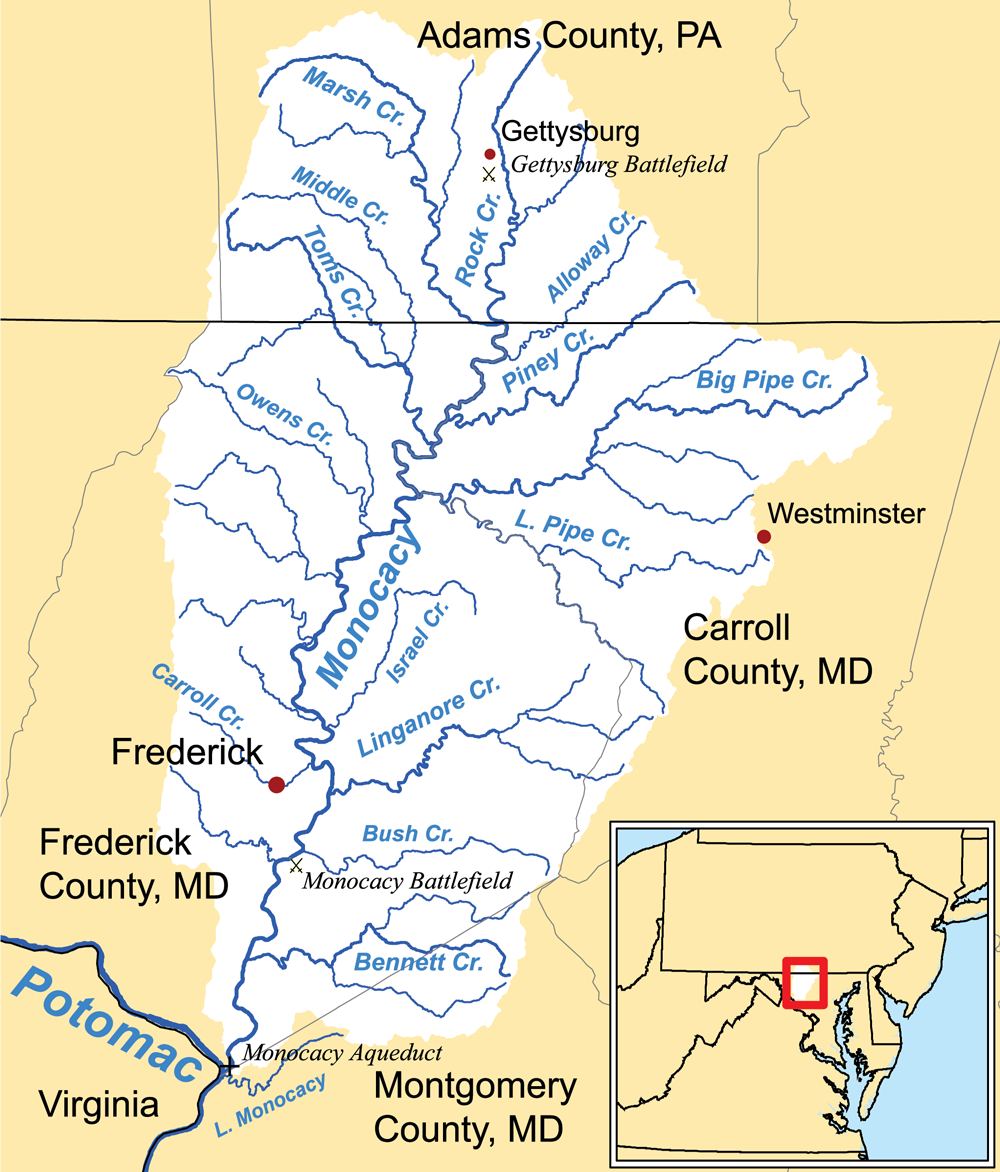
    Monocacy River watershed
    - Bennett Creek
    - Ballenger Creek
    - Bush Creek
    - Linganore Creek
    - Carroll Creek
    - Israel Creek
    - Tuscarora Creek
      - Little Tuscarora Creek
    - Fishing Creek
    - Big Hunting Creek
      - Little Hunting Creek (Maryland)
    - Owens Creek (Maryland)
      - Beaver Branch
    - Double Pipe Creek
      - Big Pipe Creek
      - Little Pipe Creek
        - Sams Creek
    - Toms Creek
      - Friends Creek
      - Middle Creek
      - Flat Run
    - Piney Creek
    - Alloway Creek
    - Marsh Creek
    - Rock Creek
  - Tuscarora Creek
  - Catoctin Creek
    - Broad Run (Catoctin Creek tributary)
    - Little Catoctin Creek (east)
    - Little Catoctin Creek (west)
    - Middle Creek
  - Little Catoctin Creek
  - Israel Creek
  - Antietam Creek
    - Little Antietam Creek (south)
    - Beaver Creek
    - Marsh Run
    - Little Antietam Creek (north)
  - Conococheague Creek
  - Little Conococheague Creek
  - Licking Creek
    - Little Cove Creek
  - Tonoloway Creek
  - Sideling Hill Creek
    - Bear Creek
  - Fifteenmile Creek
  - Town Creek
    - Flintstone Creek
  - North Branch Potomac River
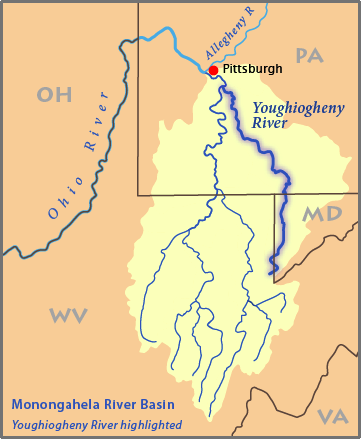
    Monongahela River watershed
    - Evitts Creek
    - Wills Creek
      - Jennings Run
    - Georges Creek
      - Laurel Run
    - Savage River

=== Mississippi River ===
- Mississippi River
  - Ohio River
    - Monongahela River (PA)
      - Youghiogheny River
        - Casselman River
        - Reason Run
        - Bear Creek
        - Little Youghiogheny River

== Alphabetically ==
- Alloway Creek
- Anacostia River
- Antietam Creek
- Back River
- Ballenger Creek
- Basin Run
- Bear Creek (Rhode River tributary)
- Bear Creek (Sideling Hill Creek tributary)
- Bear Creek (Youghiogheny River tributary)
- Beaver Branch
- Beaver Creek
- Beaver Run
- Beaverdam Creek (Anacostia River tributary)
- Beaverdam Creek
- Beaverdam Run
- Bennett Creek
- Big Annemessex River
- Big Elk Creek
- Big Hunting Creek
- Big Pipe Creek
- Bird River
- Blackwater River
- Bodkin Creek
- Bread and Cheese Creek
- Broad Creek (Choptank River tributary)
- Broad Creek (Potomac River tributary)
- Broad Creek (Susquehanna River tributary)
- Broad Run
- Broad Run (Catoctin Creek tributary)
- Budds Creek
- Bush Creek
- Bush Creek
- Bush River
- Bynum Run
- Casselman River
- Cabin John Creek
- Carroll Branch
- Catoctin Creek
- Chester River
- Chicamuxen Creek
- Choptank River
- Christina River
- Conococheague Creek
- Cranberry Run
- Cuckold Creek
- Curtis Creek
- Deer Creek
- Deep Run
- Difficult Run
- Dividing Creek
- Double Pipe Creek
- Dry Seneca Creek
- Dueling Creek
- Dundee Creek
- Elk River
- Evitts Creek
- Fifteenmile Creek
- Fishing Creek
- Flat Run
- Flintstone Creek
- Friends Creek
- Frog Mortar Creek
- Furnace Creek
- Gasheys Creek
- Georges Creek
- Georges Run
- Great Seneca Creek
- Grays Run
- Gunpowder Falls
- Gunpowder River
- Gwynns Falls
- Hawlings River
- Harris Creek
- Henson Creek
- Herring Run
- Horsepen Branch
- Indian Creek (Anacostia River tributary)
- Indian Creek (Patuxent River tributary)
- Israel Creek
- Israel Creek (Potomac River tributary)
- James Run
- Jennings Run
- Jones Falls
- Laurel Run
- Licking Creek
- Limekiln Branch
- Linganore Creek
- Little Antietam Creek (north)
- Little Antietam Creek (south)
- Little Catoctin Creek (east)
- Little Catoctin Creek (west)
- Little Catoctin Creek (Potomac River tributary)
- Little Choptank River
- Little Conococheague Creek
- Little Cove Creek
- Little Elk Creek
- Little Falls Branch
- Little Gunpowder Falls
- Little Hunting Creek
- Little Monocacy River
- Little North East Creek
- Little Paint Branch
- Little Patuxent River
- Little Pipe Creek
- Little Seneca Creek
- Little Tuscarora Creek
- Little Youghiogheny River
- Lyons Creek
- Magothy River
- Marley Creek
- Marsh Creek (Catoctin Creek tributary)
- Marsh Creek (Monocacy River tributary)
- Marsh Run
- Marshyhope Creek
- Marumsco Creek
- Mattawoman Creek
- McGill Run
- Middle Creek (Catoctin Creek tributary)
- Middle Creek (Toms Creek tributary)
- Middle Run
- Middle Patuxent River
- Middle River
- Mill Branch
- Mill Creek
- Minnehaha Branch
- Monocacy River
- Moores Run
- Morgan Run
- Muddy Branch
- Nanjemoy Creek
- Nanticoke River
- North Branch Patapsco River
- North Branch Potomac River
- North East Creek
- North East River
- Northeast Branch Anacostia River
- Northwest Branch Anacostia River
- Northwest Branch Patapsco River
- Octoraro Creek
- Otter Point Creek
- Oxon Creek
- Owens Creek (Maryland)
- Paint Branch
- Patapsco River
- Patuxent River
- Piney Creek
- Piney Run
- Piney Run (Western Run tributary)
- Piscataway Creek
- Pocomoke River
- Pomonkey Creek
- Popes Creek
- Port Tobacco River
- Potomac River
- Principio Creek
- Reason Run
- Rhode River
- Rock Creek (Monocacy River tributary)
- Rock Creek (Potomac River tributary)
- Rock Run
- St. Marys River
- Saltpeter Creek
- Sams Creek
- Sassafras River
- Savage River
- Seneca Creek
- Severn River
- Sideling Hill Creek
- Sligo Creek
- South Branch Patapsco River
- South River
- Stony Creek
- Stony Run (North East River tributary)
- Susquehanna River
- Swan Creek
- Swanson Creek
- Tenmile Creek
- Toms Creek
- Tonoloway Creek
- Town Creek (Patuxent River tributary)
- Town Creek (Potomac River tributary)
- Town Creek (Tred Avon River tributary)
- Towson Run
- Tuckahoe Creek
- Tuscarora Creek (Monocacy River tributary)
- Tuscarora Creek (Potomac River tributary)
- Watts Branch (Anacostia River tributary)
- Watts Branch (Potomac River tributary)
- West River
- Western Run
- Western Run (Gunpowder Falls tributary)
- Western Branch Patuxent River
- Whitemarsh Run
- Wicomico River (Maryland eastern shore)
- Wicomico River (Potomac River tributary)
- Wills Creek
- Winters Run
- Wye River
- Youghiogheny River

== See also ==
- List of islands in Maryland
- List of rivers in the United States
