= List of Maryland placenames of Native American origin =

The following list includes settlements, geographic features, and political subdivisions of Maryland whose names are derived from Native American languages.

== Listings ==
=== Counties ===
- Allegany County - From the Lenape word welhik hane
- Wicomico County - named for the Wicomico River, which in turn derives from the Algonquian words wicko mekee, meaning "a place where houses are built," apparently referring to a Native American town on the banks.

=== Settlements ===
- Accokeek - named for the Accokeek tribe.
- Aquasco - the name is derived from the Native American name Aquascake.
- Algonquin - named after the Algonquian peoples
- Assateague, Algonquin - Assateague Island
- Catoctin Furnace - the name Catoctin probably derives from the Kittoctons, a Native American tribe or clan which once lived between the Catoctin Mountain and the Potomac River. However, a local tradition asserts that Catoctin means "place of many deer" in a Native American language.
- Chaptico - Chaptico may be Algonquian for "big-broad-river-it-is" and related to the Chaptico tribe visited by Gov. Charles Calvert in 1663.
- Chesapeake Beach - named for the Chesapeake people, an Algonquian-speaking tribe that resided in Virginia.
- Choptank - local tradition has it that the name choptank was a crude Anglicisation of the Algonquian name for the river, probably in the Nanticoke language. There was also a group of Algonquians called the Choptank tribe.
- Conowingo - Conowingo is a Susquehannock word for "at the rapids".
- Matapeake - named for the historic Matapeake tribe, who lived there at the time of English colonization in 1631. Their chief village was on the southeast side of Kent Island. They were an Algonquian-speaking tribe, affilated with the Nanticoke people.
- Mondawmin - from Ojibwe mandaamin, meaning ‘maize’
- Nanjemoy - named for the Algonquian-speaking Nanjemoy tribe. They were a sub-tribe of the Piscataway tribe.
- Nanticoke - named for the Nanticoke people, an Algonquian tribe.
- Nassawango Hills - older variations on the same name include Nassanongo, Naseongo, Nassiongo, and Nassiungo meaning "[ground] between [the streams]"; early English records have it as Askimenokonson Creek, after a Native American settlement near its headwaters (askimenokonson roughly translated from the local Algonquian word meaning "stony place where they pick early [straw]berries").
- North Potomac
- Patapsco - the name Patapsco is derived from pota-psk-ut, which translates to "backwater" or "tide covered with froth" in Algonquian dialect.
- Patuxent - named for the Patuxent people.
- Piscataway - named for the Piscataway tribe.
- Pocomoke City - "Pocomoke" locally /ˈpoʊkoʊmoʊk/, though traditionally interpreted as "dark (or black) water" by local residents, is now agreed by scholars of the Algonquian languages to be derived from the words for "broken (or pierced) ground," and likely referred to the farming practices of the surrounding indigenous peoples.
- Pomonkey - named for the Pamunkey tribe living in the area. The historical Pamunkey tribe was part of the Powhatan Confederacy, made up of Algonquian-speaking tribes.
- Potomac - Potomac is a European spelling of an Algonquian name for a tribe subject to the Powhatan confederacy, that inhabited the upper reaches of the Northern Neck in the vicinity of Fredericksburg, Virginia. Some accounts say the name means "place where people trade" or "the place to which tribute is brought". The natives called the river above the falls Cohongarooton, translated as "river of geese", and that area was renowned in early years for an abundance of both geese and swans. The spelling of the name has been simplified over the years from "Patawomeke" (as on Captain John Smith's map) to "Patowmack" in the 18th century and now "Potomac".
- Potomac Heights
- Potomac Park -
- Quantico - Quantico is a Native American name meaning "place of dancing."
- Romancoke - the name Romancoke comes from the Algonquian word for "circling of the water."
- Seneca - named for the Seneca people, an Iroquoian tribe.
- Takoma Park - originally the name of Mount Rainier, from Lushootseed [təqʷúbəʔ] (earlier *təqʷúməʔ), 'snow-covered mountain'. The location on the boundary of DC and Maryland was named Takoma in 1883 by DC resident Ida Summy, who believed it to mean 'high up' or 'near heaven'.
- Tuxedo - Tuxedo may derive from the Lenape epithet Tùkwsit 'the Wolf Clans', or from Munsee Delaware p'tuck-sepo 'crooked river'.
- Tuscarora - named for the Tuscarora people, an Iroquoian tribe.
- Wilson-Conococheague - the word Conococheague is translated from the Lenape language to mean "Water of many turns".
- West Pocomoke - derived from Algonquian words for "broken (or pierced) ground,"

=== Bodies of water ===
- Chesapeake Bay - named after the Chesapeake tribe of Virginia. "Chesapeake" is derived from the Algonquian word Chesepiooc referring to a village "at a big river." It is the seventh oldest surviving English place-name in the U.S., first applied as "Chesepiook" by explorers heading north from the Roanoke Colony into a Chesapeake tributary in 1585 or 1586. In 2005, Algonquian linguist Blair Rudes "helped to dispel one of the area's most widely held beliefs: that 'Chesapeake' means something like 'Great Shellfish Bay.' It does not, Rudes said. The name might actually mean something like 'Great Water,' or it might have been just a village at the bay's mouth."
- Nassawango Creek - older variations on the same name include Nassanongo, Naseongo, Nassiongo, and Nassiungo meaning "[ground] between [the streams]"; early English records have it as Askimenokonson Creek, after a Native settlement near its headwaters (askimenokonson roughly translated from the local Algonquian word meaning "stony place where they pick early [straw]berries").
- Patapsco River - the name "Patapsco" is derived from pota-psk-ut, which translates to "backwater" or "tide covered with froth" in Algonquian dialect.
- Monocacy River - The name "Monocacy" comes from the Shawnee name for the river, Monnockkesey, which translates to "river with many bends." (However, another local tradition asserts that "Monocacy" means "well-fenced garden" in an Indian language.)

== Other places ==
This is a list of Native American place names in the U.S. state of Maryland.

- Accokeek, Maryland
- Anacostia River
- Aquasco, Maryland
- Catoctin Mountain
- Chaptico, Maryland
- Chesapeake Bay
- Choptank River
- Choptank, Maryland
- Conewago Creek (west)
- Conococheague Creek
- Conowingo Creek
- Conowingo, Maryland
- Honga River
- Indian Creek Village, Maryland
- Indian Head, Maryland
- Indian Springs, Maryland
- Lake Kittamaqundi
- Little Choptank River
- Little Conococheague Creek
- Little Monocacy River
- Matapeake, Maryland
- Mattawoman Creek
- Monocacy River
- Nanjemoy Creek
- Nanjemoy, Maryland
- Nanticoke River
- Nanticoke River Wildlife Management Area
- Nanticoke, Maryland
- Nassawango Creek
- Oppoquimimi River
- Patapsco River
- Patuxent River
- Piscataway Creek
- Piscataway Park
- Piscataway, Maryland
- Pocomoke City, Maryland
- Pocomoke River
- Pocomoke Sound
- Pomonkey Creek
- Pomonkey, Maryland
- Quantico, Maryland
- Susquehanna River
- Tuscarora Creek (Monocacy River)
- Tuscarora Creek (Potomac River)
- Tuscarora, Maryland
- Wicomico County, Maryland
- Wicomico River (Maryland eastern shore)
- Wicomico River (Potomac River)
- Youghiogheny River

== See also ==
- History of Maryland
