= Mill Branch =

Mill Branch may refer to:

- Mill Branch (Tussocky Branch tributary), a stream in Sussex County, Delaware
- Mill Branch (Marshyhope Creek tributary), a stream in Dorchester County, Maryland
- Mill Branch (Patuxent River), a stream in Maryland
- Mill Branch (Clear Creek), a stream in Missouri
- Mill Branch (Duck River), a stream in Tennessee
- Mill Branch (Cacapon River), a stream in West Virginia

== See also ==
- Mill Branch site
