= Watts Branch =

Watts Branch is the name of some streams in the United States:

- Watts Branch (Anacostia River), Prince George's County, Maryland and Washington, D.C.
- Watts Branch (Potomac River), Montgomery County, Maryland
- Watts Branch (Missouri), a stream in Missouri
