= Tonoloway =

Tonoloway may refer to:

- Tonoloway Creek, also known as Great Tonoloway Creek, a tributary of the Potomac River in Maryland and Pennsylvania
  - Little Tonoloway Creek (Pennsylvania), a tributary of Tonoloway Creek in Pennsylvania
- Little Tonoloway Creek (Maryland), a tributary of the Potomac River in Maryland
- Tonoloway Ridge, a mountain ridge that runs southwest northeast through Pennsylvania, Maryland, and West Virginia
- Fort Tonoloway State Park, a Maryland state park in Washington County
- Tonoloway Formation, a limestone bedrock unit in the Appalachian Mountains
