= Slaughter Creek =

Slaughter Creek may refer to:

- Slaughter Creek (Maryland)
- Slaughter Creek (South Dakota)
