= Raccoon Branch (Sullivan Branch tributary) =

Stream in Maryland, USA

Raccoon Branch Tributary to Sullivan Branch
- Location of Raccoon Branch mouth Raccoon Branch (Sullivan Branch tributary) (the United States)

Location
- Country: United States
- State: Maryland
- County: Caroline

Physical characteristics
- Source: Tommy Wright Branch divide
  - location: about 1.5 miles south of Concord, Maryland
  - coordinates: 38°47′3.00″N 075°46′57.00″W
  - elevation: 52 ft (16 m)
- Mouth: Sullivan Branch
  - location: Agner, Maryland
  - coordinates: 38°45′13.41″N 075°46′56.76″W
  - elevation: 30 ft (9.1 m)
- Length: 1.62 mi (2.61 km)
- Basin size: 1.88 square miles (4.9 km^{2})
- Discharge
  - location: Sullivan Branch
  - average: 2.20 cu ft/s (0.062 m^{3}/s) at mouth with Sullivan Branch

Basin features
- Progression: Sullivan Branch → Marshyhope Creek → Nanticoke River → Chesapeake Bay → Atlantic Ocean
- River system: Nanticoke River
- Tributaries
  - left: unnamed tributaries
  - right: unnamed tributaries
- Bridges: Chipmans Lane

Raccoon Branch is a 1.62 mi (2.61 km) long first-order tributary to Sullivan Branch in Caroline County, Maryland.

== Course ==
Raccoon Branch rises about 1.5 miles (2.4 km) south of Concord, Maryland, and then flows generally south to join Wolfpit Branch to form Sullivan Branch at Agner, Maryland.

== Watershed ==
Raccoon Branch drains 1.88 square miles (4.9 km^{2}) of area, receives about 44.6 in/year of precipitation, and is about 8.00% forested.

== See also ==
- List of Maryland rivers
- List of rivers of the United States
