= Mill Creek (Marshyhope Creek tributary) =

Stream in Maryland, USA

Mill Creek Tributary to Marshyhope Creek
- Location of Mill Creek mouth Mill Creek (Marshyhope Creek tributary) (the United States)

Location
- Country: United States
- State: Maryland
- County: Dorchester

Physical characteristics
- Source: Chicamacomico River divide
  - location: about 1 mile southwest of Ennalls, Maryland
  - coordinates: 38°35′7.00″N 075°51′40.00″W
  - elevation: 38 ft (12 m)
- Mouth: Marshyhope Creek
  - location: about 1.5 miles east-southeast of Ennalls, Maryland
  - coordinates: 38°35′54.42″N 075°48′56.26″W
  - elevation: 0 ft (0 m)
- Length: 2.71 mi (4.36 km)
- Basin size: 3.88 square miles (10.0 km^{2})
- Discharge
  - location: Marshyhope Creek
  - average: 4.24 cu ft/s (0.120 m^{3}/s) at mouth with Marshyhope Creek

Basin features
- Progression: Marshyhope Creek → Nanticoke River → Chesapeake Bay → Atlantic Ocean
- River system: Nanticoke River
- Tributaries
  - left: unnamed tributaries
  - right: unnamed tributaries
- Bridges: Corkran Cemetery Road, Palmer Mill Road

Mill Creek is a 2.71 mi (4.36 km) long second-order tributary to Marshyhope Creek in Dorchester County, Maryland.

== Course ==
Mill Creek rises about 1 mile (1.6 km) southwest of Ennalls, Maryland and then flows northeast to join Marshyhope Creek about 1.5 miles east-southeast of Ennalls, Maryland.

== Watershed ==
Mill Creek drains 3.88 square miles (10.0 km^{2}) of area, receives about 44.2 in/year of precipitation and is about 9.98% forested.

== See also ==
- List of Maryland rivers
- List of rivers of the United States
