= Wolfpit Branch (Sullivan Branch tributary) =

Stream in Maryland, USA

Wolfpit Branch Tributary to Sullivan Branch
- Location of Wolfpit Branch mouth Wolfpit Branch (Sullivan Branch tributary) (the United States)

Location
- Country: United States
- State: Maryland
- County: Caroline

Physical characteristics
- Source: Tommy Wright Branch divide
  - location: about 1 mile south of Concord, Maryland
  - coordinates: 38°47′25.00″N 075°46′59.99″W
  - elevation: 52 ft (16 m)
- Mouth: Sullivan Branch
  - location: Agner, Maryland
  - coordinates: 38°45′13.41″N 075°46′56.76″W
  - elevation: 30 ft (9.1 m)
- Length: 3.55 mi (5.71 km)
- Basin size: 3.33 square miles (8.6 km^{2})
- Discharge
  - location: Sullivan Branch
  - average: 3.87 cu ft/s (0.110 m^{3}/s) at mouth with Sullivan Branch

Basin features
- Progression: Sullivan Branch → Marshyhope Creek → Nanticoke River → Chesapeake Bay → Atlantic Ocean
- River system: Nanticoke River
- Tributaries
  - left: unnamed tributaries
  - right: unnamed tributaries
- Bridges: Federalsburg Highway, Possum Hill Road, Chipmans Lane

Wolfpit Branch is a 3.55 mi (5.71 km) long first-order tributary to Sullivan Branch in Caroline County, Maryland.

== Course ==
Wolfpit Branch rises about 1 mile (1.6 km) south of Concord, Maryland, and then flows generally south to join Raccoon Branch to form Sullivan Branch at Agner, Maryland.

== Watershed ==
Wolfpit Branch drains 3.33 square miles (8.6 km^{2}) of area, receives about 44.6 in/year of precipitation, and is about 17.92% forested.

== See also ==
- List of Maryland rivers
- List of rivers of the United States
