= Bird River =

Bird River can refer to:

- Bird River (Maryland), United States
- Bird River (Tasmania), Australia
- Bird River, community on the Bird River in the Rural Municipality of Alexander, Manitoba, Canada
  - Bird River (Lac du Bonnet) Airport
  - Bird River greenstone belt
- Red Bird River, Kentucky, United States

== See also ==
- Berd (river)
- Bird (disambiguation)
