= Frog Creek =

Frog Creek may refer to the following places in the United States:

- Frog Creek, Wisconsin, a town
- Frog Creek (Florida), a park
- Frog Creek (Oregon), a stream
- Frog Creek (West Virginia), a stream
- Frog Creek, Pennsylvania, a fictional town in the Magic Tree House children's book series

== See also ==
- Creek frog (disambiguation)
- Frog Mortar Creek
