= Creek frog =

Creek frog may refer to:

- Kuhl's creek frog (Limnonectes kuhlii), a frog in the family Dicroglossidae found in Java
- Stone creek frog (Limnonectes macrodon), a frog in the family Dicroglossidae endemic to Sumatra and Java, Indonesia
- Stony creek frog (Litoria wilcoxii), a frog in the family Hylidae endemic to the east coast of Australia

== See also ==
- Frog Creek (disambiguation)
