= Broad Run (Loudoun County, Virginia) =

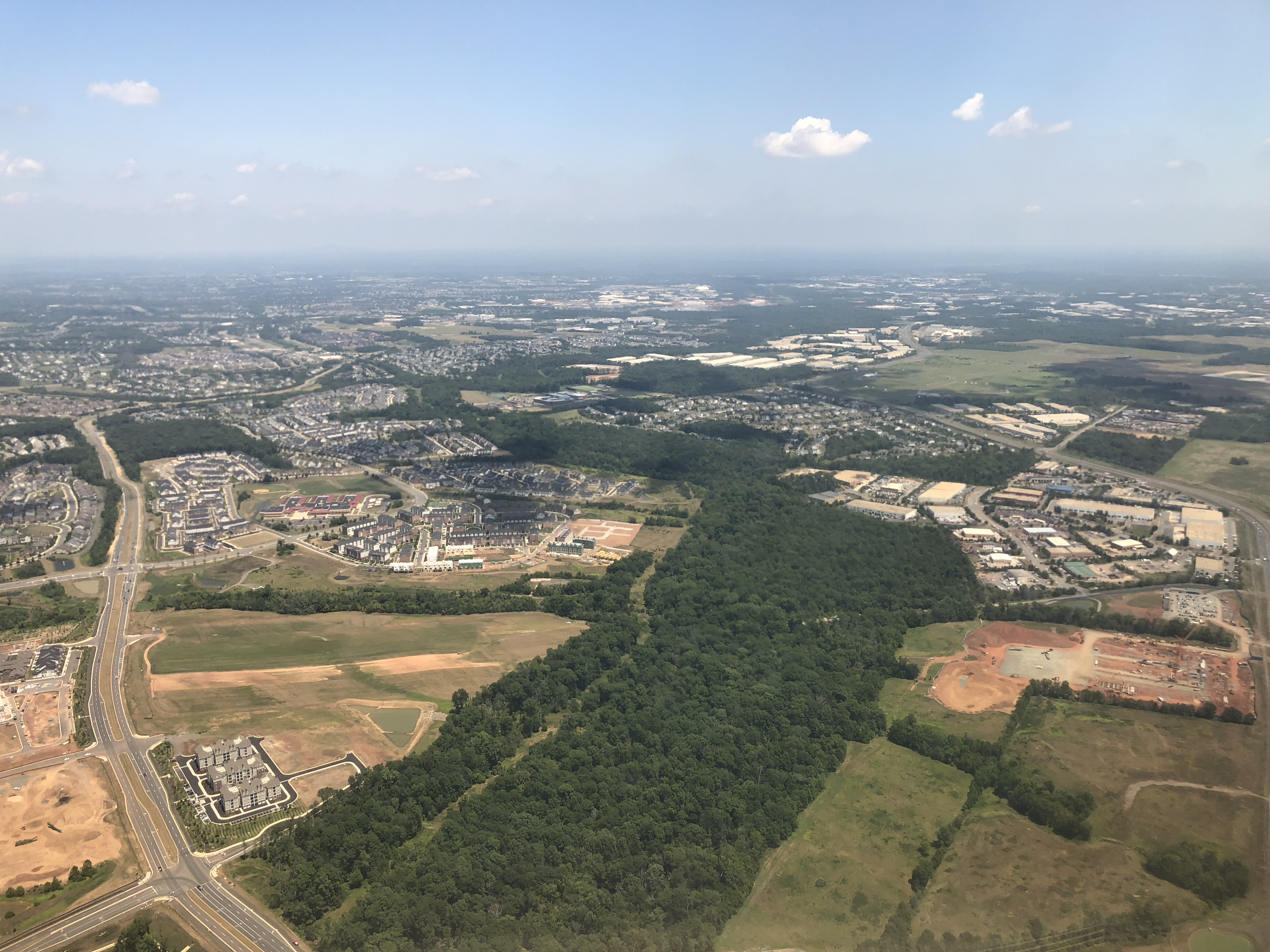
- Broad Run passes through an increasingly suburbanized environment in eastern Loudoun County

Location
- Country: United States
- State: Virginia
- Region: Loudoun County

Physical characteristics
- Source
  - location: Aldie
  - coordinates: 38.9862207°N 77.586381°W
- Mouth: Potomac River
  - location: Sterling
  - coordinates: 39.0712187°N 77.4438770°W
  - elevation: 184 ft (56 m)
- Basin size: 91.3 mi^{2} (236 km^{2})

Basin features
- Tributaries
  - left: Beaverdam Run
  - right: Lenah Run, South Fork (Shenandoah River), Cabin Branch (Arcola), Horsepen Run, Cabin Branch (Sterling)

Broad Run is a tributary of the Potomac River in Loudoun County, Virginia. The creek, located between Goose Creek and Sugarland Run, principally drains portions of eastern Loudoun County, as well as a small portion of western Fairfax County.

The headwaters of the creek are located about 3 miles (4.8 km) northeast of Aldie. The creek flows eastward near Arcola and continues generally northeast to its mouth at the Potomac near the southern end of Seldon's Island to the north of Sterling and about 10 miles (16 km) southeast of Leesburg. The watershed of the creek is 67.5 mi^{2} (175 km^{2}) in Loudoun and 23.8 mi^{2} (62 km^{2}) in Fairfax.

The majority of the run forms the border between the unincorporated areas of Ashburn and Sterling. The Broad Run Magisterial District of Loudoun and Broad Run High School derive their names from the waterway. The Broad Run Bridge and Tollhouse is a national listed historic site.

The creek should not be confused with the nearby Broad Run (a tributary of the Occoquan River) that flows through Fauquier and Prince William Counties.

== Tributaries ==
Tributaries are listed in order from the mouth of Broad Run to its source.

- Beaverdam Run
  - Russell Branch
- Cabin Branch 2
- Horsepen Run
  - Stallion Branch
  - Indian Creek
- Cabin Branch 1
- South Fork Broad Run
- North Fork Broad Run
  - Lenah Run

== See also ==
- Broad Run (Occoquan River)
- Broad Run (Maryland)
