= Broad Run Bridge and Tollhouse =

- U.S. National Register of Historic Places
- U.S. Historic district
- Virginia Landmarks Register
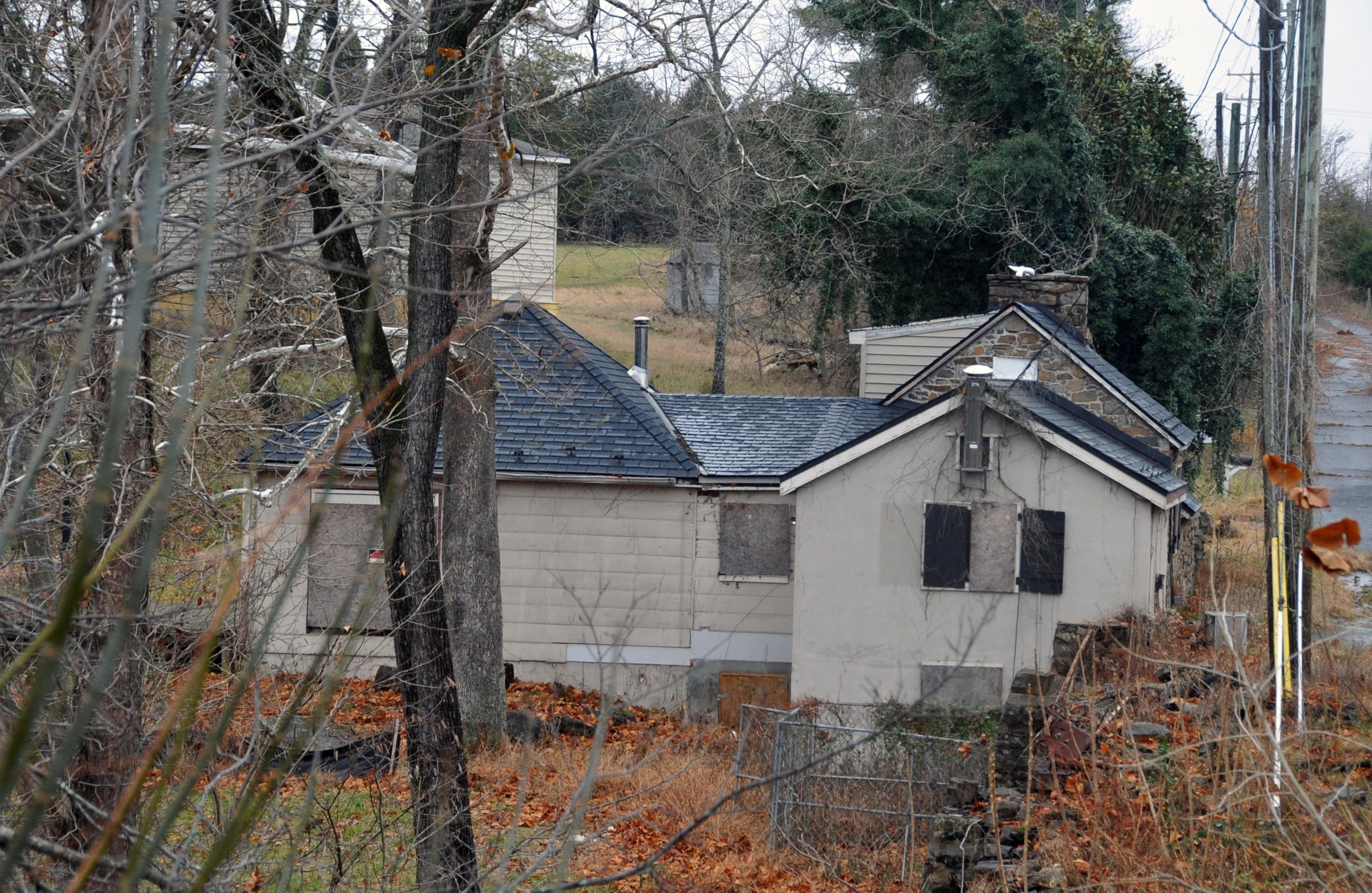
- The tollhouse in 2007

- Location within Northern Virginia Location within Virginia Location within the United States
- Location: West of Junction of Rtes. 7 and 28 with Broad Run, Ashburn, Virginia
- Coordinates: 39°2′48″N 77°25′59″W
- Area: .85 acres (0.34 ha)
- Built: 1820
- NRHP reference No.: 70000808
- VLR No.: 053-0110

Significant dates
- Added to NRHP: April 17, 1970
- Designated VLR: December 2, 1969

The Broad Run Bridge and Tollhouse were built for the Leesburg Turnpike Company in Loudoun County, Virginia. The stone bridge, built about 1820, was a permanent replacement for a series of wood bridges at the location, with at least three that had been washed away between 1771 and 1803. The bridge spanned Broad Run on two arches with prominent conical buttresses. The road rose to the center of the bridge. The stone toll house stands nearby. It is a one-story three-bay house that has been progressively enlarged. The Tollhouse was purchased by the Loudoun County Board of Supervisors with intentions to restore the facility.

One span of the bridge collapsed, on June 21, 1972, as a result of flooding from Hurricane Agnes. The remainder of the bridge has since collapsed, leaving only the stone abutments.

The bridge and tollhouse were placed on the National Register of Historic Places on April 17, 1970.

== See also ==
- List of bridges on the National Register of Historic Places in Virginia
