= Sullivan Branch (Marshyhope Creek tributary) =

Stream in Maryland, USA

Sullivan Branch Tributary to Marshyhope Creek
- Location of Sullivan Branch mouth Sullivan Branch (Marshyhope Creek tributary) (the United States)

Location
- Country: United States
- State: Maryland
- County: Caroline

Physical characteristics
- Source: confluence of Wolfpit and Raccoon Branches
  - location: about 3 miles north of Federalsburg, Maryland
  - coordinates: 38°45′15.41″N 075°46′56.76″W
  - elevation: 38 ft (12 m)
- Mouth: Marshyhope Creek
  - location: about 2.5 miles north-northeast of Federalsburg, Maryland
  - coordinates: 38°46′45.41″N 075°45′38.76″W
  - elevation: 6 ft (1.8 m)
- Length: 2.34 mi (3.77 km)
- Basin size: 7.05 square miles (18.3 km^{2})
- Discharge
  - location: Marshyhope Creek
  - average: 8.19 cu ft/s (0.232 m^{3}/s) at mouth with Marshyhope Creek

Basin features
- Progression: Marshyhope Creek → Nanticoke River → Chesapeake Bay → Atlantic Ocean
- River system: Nanticoke River
- Tributaries
  - left: Raccoon Branch
  - right: Wolfpit Branch
- Bridges: Long Swamp Road, Smithville Road

Sullivan Branch is a 2.34 mi (3.77 km) long second-order tributary to Marshyhope Creek in Caroline County, Maryland.

== Course ==
Sullivan Branch rises about 3 miles (4.8 km) north of Federalsburg, Maryland and then flows southeast to join Marshyhope Creek about 2.5 miles (4.0 km) north-northeast of Federalsburg, Maryland.

== Watershed ==
Sullivan Branch drains 7.05 square miles (18.3 km^{2}) of area, receives about 44.6 in/year of precipitation, and is about 12.53% forested.

== See also ==
- List of Maryland rivers
