= Starners Dam Bridge =

- Coordinates: 39.698993°N 77.214662°W
- Carries: two lanes of roadway
- Crosses: Alloway Creek
- Official name: Starners Dam Bridge
- Other name(s): Alloway Creek Bridge
- Maintained by: County Highway Agency

Characteristics
- Design: Steel stringer bridge
- Total length: 19.2 metres (63 ft 0 in)
- Width: 6.6 metres (21 ft 8 in)
- Longest span: 18.6 metres (61 ft 0 in)

History
- Construction start: 1911
- Construction end: 1911
- Opened: 1911

Statistics
- Daily traffic: 232 (as of 2008)
- Toll: free

The Starners Dam Bridge is a steel stringer bridge over Alloway Creek on Baptist Road in Taneytown, Carroll County, Maryland, USA. It is also called Alloway Creek Bridge.

== History ==
The steel stringer bridge was constructed in 1911 with construction number 200000CL0207010 about 0.11 miles north of Starners Dam in Taneytown. When it was constructed, the bridge was 19.2 metres (63 ft 0 in) long, 6.6 metres (21 ft 8 in) wide and weighed 62.4 tons. Its deck was made by concrete cast-in-place and it has two lanes of roadway which are part of Baptist Road. Its purpose is to carry Baptist Road over Alloway Creek.

It was reconstructed in 1987 and is now owned by the County Highway Agency. In 2008, it had an average daily traffic of 232 vehicles with 5% of truck traffic and it is toll free. It is inspected for flaws every 24 months.
