= Pamunkey Creek =

Coordinates: 38.10625°N 77.83749°W

Location
- Country: United States

Physical characteristics
- Source
  - location: Virginia

Pamunkey Creek is a 20.8-mile-long (33.5 km) river in Orange and Spotsylvania counties in the U.S. state of Virginia. It is a tributary of the North Anna River.

The creek is formed by the confluence of smaller branches that rise in the town of Orange, Virginia, then flows southeast across the Virginia Piedmont. It joins the North Anna as an arm of Lake Anna, a reservoir. Via the North Anna, Pamunkey, and York rivers, Pamunkey Creek is part of the Chesapeake Bay watershed.

== See also ==
- List of rivers of Virginia
- Pomonkey Creek in Maryland
- (Pomonkey: tribe and place in Maryland vs. Pamunkey: tribe and place in Virginia)
