= Smithville Ditch =

Stream in Maryland, USA

Smithville Ditch Tributary to Tommy Wright Branch
- Location of Smithville Ditch mouth Smithville Ditch (the United States)

Location
- Country: United States
- State: Maryland
- County: Caroline

Physical characteristics
- Source: Short and Hall Ditch divide
  - location: about 5 miles southeast of Denton, Maryland
  - coordinates: 38°49′14.00″N 075°44′14.00″W
  - elevation: 52 ft (16 m)
- Mouth: Tommy Wright Branch
  - location: about 1.5 miles west-northwest of Smithville, Maryland
  - coordinates: 38°47′30.41″N 075°44′20.75″W
  - elevation: 33 ft (10 m)
- Length: 2.26 mi (3.64 km)
- Basin size: 3.43 square miles (8.9 km^{2})
- Discharge
  - location: Tommy Wright Branch
  - average: 4.06 cu ft/s (0.115 m^{3}/s) at mouth with Tommy Wright Branch

Basin features
- Progression: Tommy Wright Branch → Marshyhope Creek → Nanticoke River → Chesapeake Bay → Atlantic Ocean
- River system: Nanticoke River
- Tributaries
  - left: unnamed tributaries
  - right: unnamed tributaries
- Bridges: Melvin Road, Bullock Road, MD 404, Line Road

Smithville Ditch is a 2.26 mi (3.64 km) long second-order tributary to Tommy Wright Branch in Caroline County, Maryland. This is the only stream of this name in the United States.

== Course ==
Smithville Ditch rises about 5 miles (8.0 km) southeast of Denton, Maryland, and then flows generally south to join Tommy Wright Branch about 0.75 miles (1.21 km) west-southwest of Smithville, Maryland.

== Watershed ==
Smithville Ditch drains 3.43 square miles (8.9 km^{2}) of area, receives about 44.6 in/year of precipitation, and is about 12.11% forested.

== See also ==
- List of Maryland rivers
