= Winters Run =

River in Maryland, United States

Coordinates: 39.439275°N 76.307458°W

Winters Run is a 14.6-mile-long (23.5 km) river in Harford County, Maryland. The river begins north of the community of Fallston at the confluence of the West and East Branches, and flows southeast about 11 miles (18 km) to Atkisson Dam in Bel Air. The dam and reservoir were built by the U.S. Army in 1942 to provide an auxiliary fresh water source for nearby Edgewood Arsenal. Upon reaching the tidal line, the river is renamed Otter Point Creek, which empties to Bush River and the Chesapeake Bay. The watershed area of Winters Run is about 56 square miles (150 km^{2}).

North of the dam is Harford Glen, an environmental study area owned by the Harford County Public Schools to provide environmental education to students around the county.

== Recreational features ==
Winters Run contains areas of whitewater Class I and II as well ample fishing opportunities.

== See also ==
- List of Maryland rivers
