= Reason Run =

Stream in Pennsylvania, USA

Reason Run Tributary to Youghiogheny River
- Location of Reason Run mouth Reason Run (the United States)

Location
- Country: United States
- State: Pennsylvania; Maryland
- County: Fayette (PA); Garrett (MD)

Physical characteristics
- Source: Buffalo Run divide
  - location: about 1 mile northeast of Asher Glade, Maryland
  - coordinates: 39°42′37″N 079°25′38″W
  - elevation: 1,820 ft (550 m)
- Mouth: Youghiogheny River in Youghiogheny River Lake
  - location: about 1.5 miles southwest of Somerfield, Pennsylvania
  - coordinates: 39°43′41″N 079°24′29″W
  - elevation: 1,439 ft (439 m)
- Length: 2.19 mi (3.52 km)
- Basin size: 1.43 square miles (3.7 km^{2})
- Discharge
  - location: Youghiogheny River in Youghiogheny River Lake
  - average: 2.79 cu ft/s (0.079 m^{3}/s) at mouth with Youghiogheny River

Basin features
- Progression: Youghiogheny River → Monongahela River → Ohio River → Mississippi River → Gulf of Mexico
- River system: Monongahela River
- Tributaries
  - left: unnamed tributaries
  - right: unnamed tributaries
- Bridges: Guard Road

Reason Run is a 2.19 mi (3.52 km) long 1st order tributary to the Youghiogheny River in Fayette County, Pennsylvania.

== Course ==
Reason Run rises about 1 mile northeast of Asher Glade, Maryland in Garrett County, and then flows north-northeasterly into Fayette County, Pennsylvania to join the Youghiogheny River in Youghiogheny River Lake about 1.5 miles southwest of Somerfield.

== Watershed ==
Reason Run drains 1.43 square miles (3.7 km^{2}) of area, receives about 46.7 in/year of precipitation, has a wetness index of 330.63, and is about 75% forested.

== See also ==
- List of rivers of Maryland
- List of rivers of Pennsylvania
