= Alloway Creek (Monocacy River tributary) =

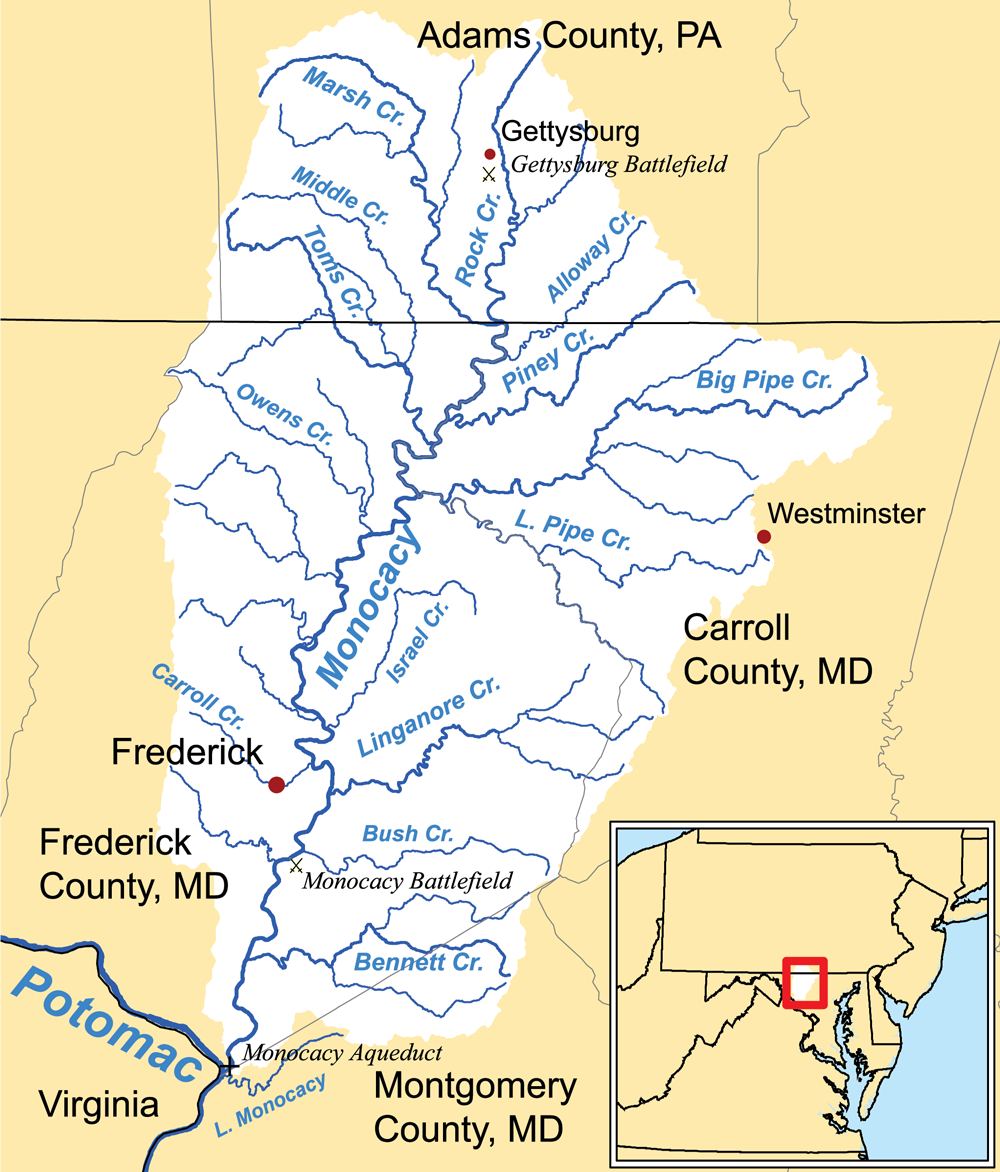
- Monocacy River watershed

Location
- Country: United States
- State: Pennsylvania, Maryland
- Counties: Adams, Carroll

Physical characteristics
- Mouth: Monocacy River
  - coordinates: 39.6989428°N 77.2152458°W

Alloway Creek is a 13.5-mile-long (21.7 km) tributary of the Monocacy River in Pennsylvania and Maryland in the United States. Via the Monocacy River, it forms part of the Potomac River watershed.

== Flow ==
The creek rises in Pennsylvania and flows in the northwest corner of Carroll County, Maryland and southeast of Adams County, Pennsylvania. The creek mouths at Palmer and empties into the Monocacy River and Piney Creek.

== Starners Dam Bridge ==
The Starners Dam Bridge is a steel stringer bridge over the creek on Baptist Road in Taneytown, Carroll County, Maryland. It is also called Alloway Creek Bridge.

== See also ==
- List of rivers of Maryland
- List of rivers of Pennsylvania
