= Chicamacomico River =

- Location of the Chicamacomico River within Maryland

Location
- Country: United States
- State: Maryland
- County: Dorchester County

Physical characteristics
- Source
  - coordinates: 38.5938°N 75.8937°W
  - elevation: 38 feet (12 m)
- Mouth
  - coordinates: 38.4279°N 75.9798°W
  - elevation: 0 feet (0 m)
- Length: 16.3 miles (26.2 km)
- Basin size: 51.6 square miles (134 km^{2})
- Depth
  - minimum: 4 inches (10 cm)
  - maximum: 11.5 feet (3.5 m)

The Chicamacomico River is a 16.3-mile-long (26.2 km) river in southern Maryland in the United States. It starts in northern Dorchester County and flows to the southwest ending within the Blackwater National Wildlife Refuge, approximately 152 feet (46 m) wide at its mouth on the east bank of the Transquaking River, near the Chesapeake Bay to the west. The Chicamacomico River has a watershed area of about 51.6 square miles (134 km^{2}).

== See also ==
- List of rivers in Maryland
