= Green Branch (Patuxent River tributary) =

Stream in Prince George's County, Maryland

Coordinates: 38°56′46.6″N 76°42′29.5″W

The Green Branch of the Patuxent River in Prince George's County, Maryland is part of the Upper Patuxent Watershed. The stream passes centrally through the Governor Bridge Natural Area / Patuxent River Park and joins the Patuxent, just south of Governor's Bridge.

The stream cuts a narrow gorge through the Aquia greensand between Crain Highway and its junction with the Patuxent.

== Drainage area ==
Green Branch drains the communities of Heather Hills, Ensleigh, Essington, Easthaven, Heather Ridge, Palisades, Pin Oak Village, Covington Manor, Governors Green and Longlea as well as the commercial areas of Bowie Gateway Center and Prince George's Stadium within Bowie, Maryland.

== Environmental concerns ==
The major pollutant in this stream is non-point sediment. The source of the sediment is erosion from construction, storm water runoff carrying lawn chemicals such as excess fertilizer, and pet waste runoff from lawns. Increased amount of runoff causes water to flow at a faster rate, which erodes stream banks and increases sediment in the water.

A large culvert on Green Branch, was significantly impairing fish passage to spawning grounds upstream on the Patuxent in 2008. Fish including herring, alewife, and American eel could not pass through the three-pipe culvert located under an access road within the Governor Bridge Natural Area. The Patuxent Riverkeeper has been working with the Maryland Department of Natural Resources Fish Passage Program to fix this and has received funding from Fish America Foundation and Chesapeake Bay Trust to support the project.

== See also ==
- Collington, Maryland
