= Popes Creek (Maryland) =

Coordinates: 38°23′49″N 76°59′20″W

Location
- Country: United States
- State: Maryland
- County: Charles County

Physical characteristics
- Mouth
  - location: Potomac River
  - elevation: 0 feet (0 m)
- Length: 3.4 mi (5.5 km)

Popes Creek is a 3.4-mile-long (5.5 km) stream in Charles County, Maryland and a tributary of the Potomac River.

== Power plant ==
The Potomac Electric Power Company (PEPCO) built the two coal units of the Morgantown Generating Station in the 1960s in Morgantown, Maryland, near the mouth of Pope's Creek. This facility, now owned by Mirant, is sometimes referred to the Pope's Creek Power Plant.

== Railroad ==
In 1853 the State of Maryland chartered the Baltimore and Potomac Rail Road Company to construct a railroad from the city of Baltimore via Upper Marlboro and Port Tobacco to a point on the Potomac River between Liverpool Point and the St. Marys River, and any branches of at most 20 miles (32 km) in length. This rail line, now operated by CSX Transportation, is known as the Pope's Creek Subdivision and carried passenger service until 1949. Today it is primarily used to haul coal to the power plant.
