= Gunpowder River =

Coordinates: 39.4022°N 76.3649°W

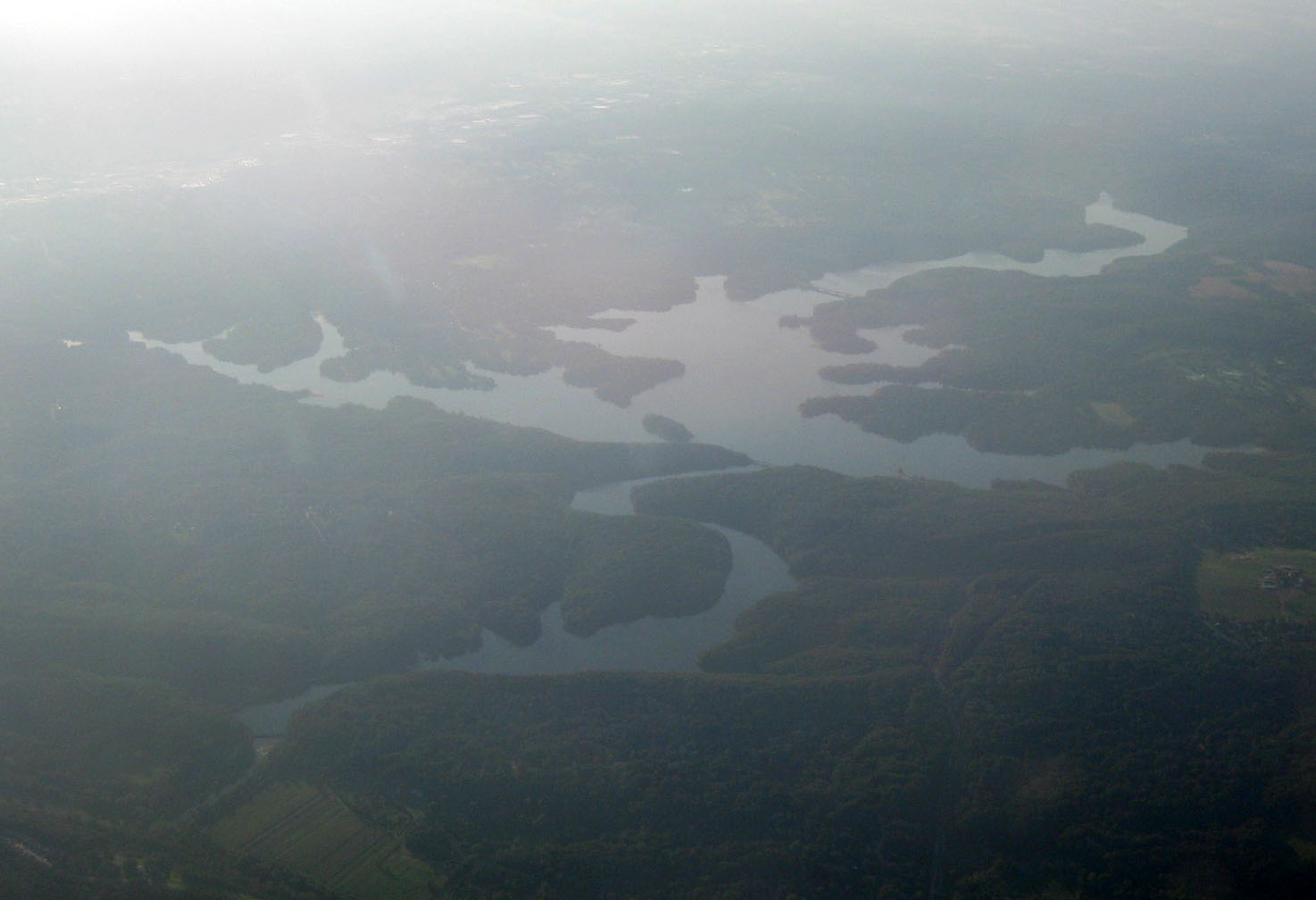
- Gunpowder River travelling through Loch Raven Reservoir in Towson, Maryland, in 2010

Location
- Country: United States
- State: Maryland
- Cities: Middle River, Joppatowne, Towson, Cockeysville, Parkton, Lineboro

Physical characteristics
- Source
  - location: Glen Rock, Pennsylvania
- Mouth: Chesapeake Bay
  - elevation: 0 ft (0 m)

Basin features
- Tributaries
  - left: Little Gunpowder Falls
  - right: Big Gunpowder Falls

The Gunpowder River is a 6.8-mile-long (10.9 km) tidal inlet on the western side of the Chesapeake Bay in Maryland, United States. It is formed by the joining of two freshwater rivers, Gunpowder Falls (often referred to locally as "Big Gunpowder Falls") and Little Gunpowder Falls.

== Gunpowder Falls ==
The Big Gunpowder, 56.7 miles (91.2 km) long, begins in the extreme southern part of Pennsylvania's York County. From there, the Gunpowder flows in a generally southeast direction through the length of Baltimore County – past the Perry Hall Mansion and the site of its former plantation – until it reaches Joppatowne where it is joined by the Little Gunpowder and the Bird River, becoming simply the "Gunpowder River" once it passes the Amtrak train bridge that joins Chase and Joppatowne. The nearby site of old Joppa was an important deep-water seaport, and rival to the port of Baltimore, in colonial American times, until sedimentation of the Gunpowder River -- caused by upstream development -- made its harbor inaccessible to large ships.

== Little Gunpowder Falls ==
Little Gunpowder Falls, as its name implies, is much smaller than the mainstem Gunpowder Falls. Throughout its 25.2-mile (40.6 km) length, it forms much of the boundary between eastern Baltimore County and western Harford County until it reaches the Big Gunpowder. The headquarters of the Gunpowder Falls State Park is located in Harford County along the bank of the Little Gunpowder Falls, in the historic Jerusalem Mill Village. The remainder of the boundary between Baltimore and Harford counties is formed by the Gunpowder River, the tidal estuary of the Chesapeake Bay formed by the union of Little Gunpowder Falls and the Gunpowder Falls rivers.

== Recreation ==
Both the Gunpowder and Little Gunpowder Falls flow through hilly agricultural and forest land for much of their length. In fact, there are no less than four separate state parks that form Gunpowder Falls State Park, the largest state park in Maryland. At two points, Gunpowder Falls is dammed to form major reservoirs for the Baltimore metropolitan area: Prettyboy Reservoir and Loch Raven Reservoir. By the time the Gunpowder reaches the Bay, however, it is no longer a rural river, but a suburban river that passes under Interstate 95 and many bedroom communities for Baltimore. Nonetheless, Gunpowder State Park on the Chesapeake Bay may give one the impression that this is still a somewhat remote river.

Both streams flow over the Fall Line separating the Piedmont Plateau from the Atlantic Coastal Plain just downstream of US Route 1. This creates some class III whitewater opportunities for kayakers and canoeists when the water is reasonably high.

The section of the Gunpowder River between Pretty Boy Reservoir and Loch Raven Reservoir is a popular fly fishing destination. The section of river is home to wild brown trout and rainbow trout. There is also a small population of brook trout

== Tributaries ==
- Minebank Run
- Long Green Creek
- Sweathouse Run
- Haystack Branch
- Jennifer Branch
- Bean Run
- Foster Branch
- Taylor Creek
- Broad Run

== See also ==
- List of Maryland rivers
- List of rivers of Pennsylvania
- List of parks in the Baltimore–Washington metropolitan area
