= Fifteenmile Creek (Potomac River tributary) =

Coordinates: 39°40′47″N 78°27′28″W

Fifteen Mile Creek
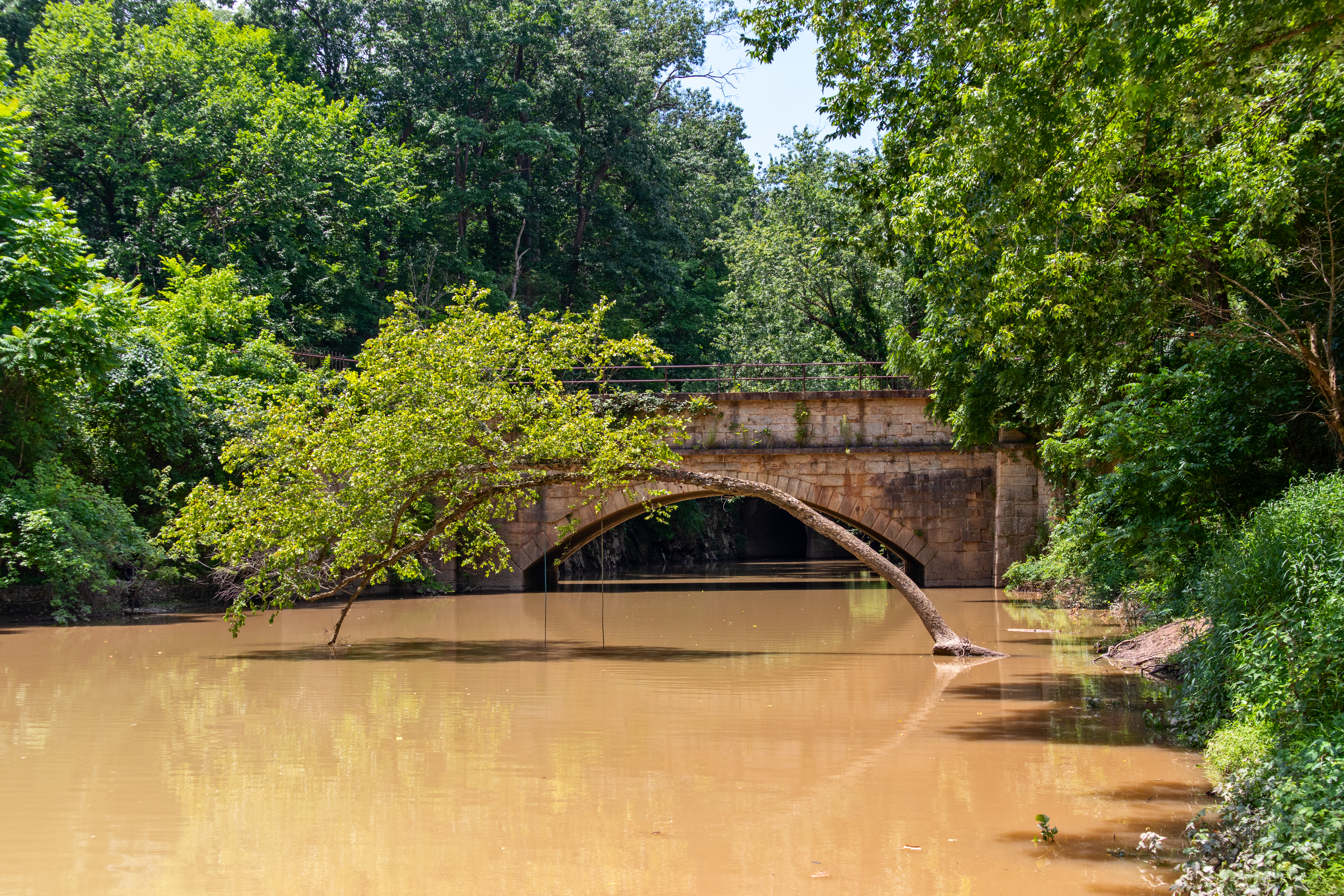
- Fifteen Mile Creek (with C&O Canal Aqueduct over it)

Physical characteristics
- Mouth
  - location: Potomac River
- Length: 19.9 mi (32.0 km)

Fifteenmile Creek is a 19.9-mile-long (32.0 km) tributary stream of the Potomac River in the U.S. states of Maryland and Pennsylvania. The creek enters the Potomac River through Maryland's Green Ridge State Forest.

== See also ==
- List of Maryland rivers
- List of rivers of Pennsylvania
