= Carroll Branch =

Stream in West Virginia, U.S.

Coordinates: 38°11′58″N 81°30′16″W

Carroll Branch is a stream in the U.S. state of West Virginia.

Carroll Branch was named after the local Carroll family which fled an Indian attack in 1789.

== See also ==
- List of rivers of West Virginia
