= Middle River (Maryland) =

Estuary in Baltimore County, Maryland, United States

Coordinates: 39.304°N 76.403°W

Middle River is an estuary in Baltimore County, Maryland, located about 5 miles (8 km) east of the city of Baltimore. The estuary extends from the community of Middle River, north of the Martin Plaza Shopping Center, to the southeast for about 4 miles (6.4 km), to the Chesapeake Bay. The watershed area of Middle River is 12 square miles (31 km^{2}), and includes Martin State Airport.

== Tributaries ==
Clockwise from the southern edge of its mouth, they are:

- Sue Creek
- Hogpen Creek
- Norman Creek
- Hopkins Creek
- Greyhound Creek
- Upper Middle River (no separate name)
- Dark Head Creek; its nontidal portion is Cowpens Run; Martins Lagoon is the upper tidal portion near Martin State Airport (neither of the latter two names are official feature names in GNIS)
- Stansbury Creek
- Frog Mortar Creek
- Galloway Creek

== See also ==
- List of Maryland rivers
