= Licking Creek (Potomac River tributary) =

River in Pennsylvania and Maryland, United States

Coordinates: 39°42′39.30″N 78°2′27.75″W

Physical characteristics
- Source: West slope of Tuscarora Mountain, near Cowans Gap State Park
- Mouth: Potomac River (downstream of Hancock)
- Length: 56.6 miles (91.1 km)

Basin features
- Progression: Potomac River -> Chesapeake Bay

Licking Creek is a 56.6-mile-long (91.1 km) tributary of the Potomac River in Pennsylvania and Maryland in the United States.

Licking Creek is born on the west slope of Tuscarora Mountain, near Cowans Gap State Park, flows through western Fulton County, Pennsylvania and then enters Washington County to join the Potomac River downstream of Hancock.

== See also ==
- List of Maryland rivers
- List of rivers of Pennsylvania
