= Mill Branch (Duck River tributary) =

River in the United States of America

Coordinates: 35.7539574°N 87.3033442°W

Mill Branch is a tributary of the Duck River in Hickman County, Tennessee, in the United States. It is a tributary to the Duck River.

== History ==
Mill Branch was named from a watermill built there around 1820.

== See also ==
- List of rivers of Tennessee
