= Bush River (Maryland) =

River in Maryland, United States

Coordinates: 39°22′30″N 76°15′56″W

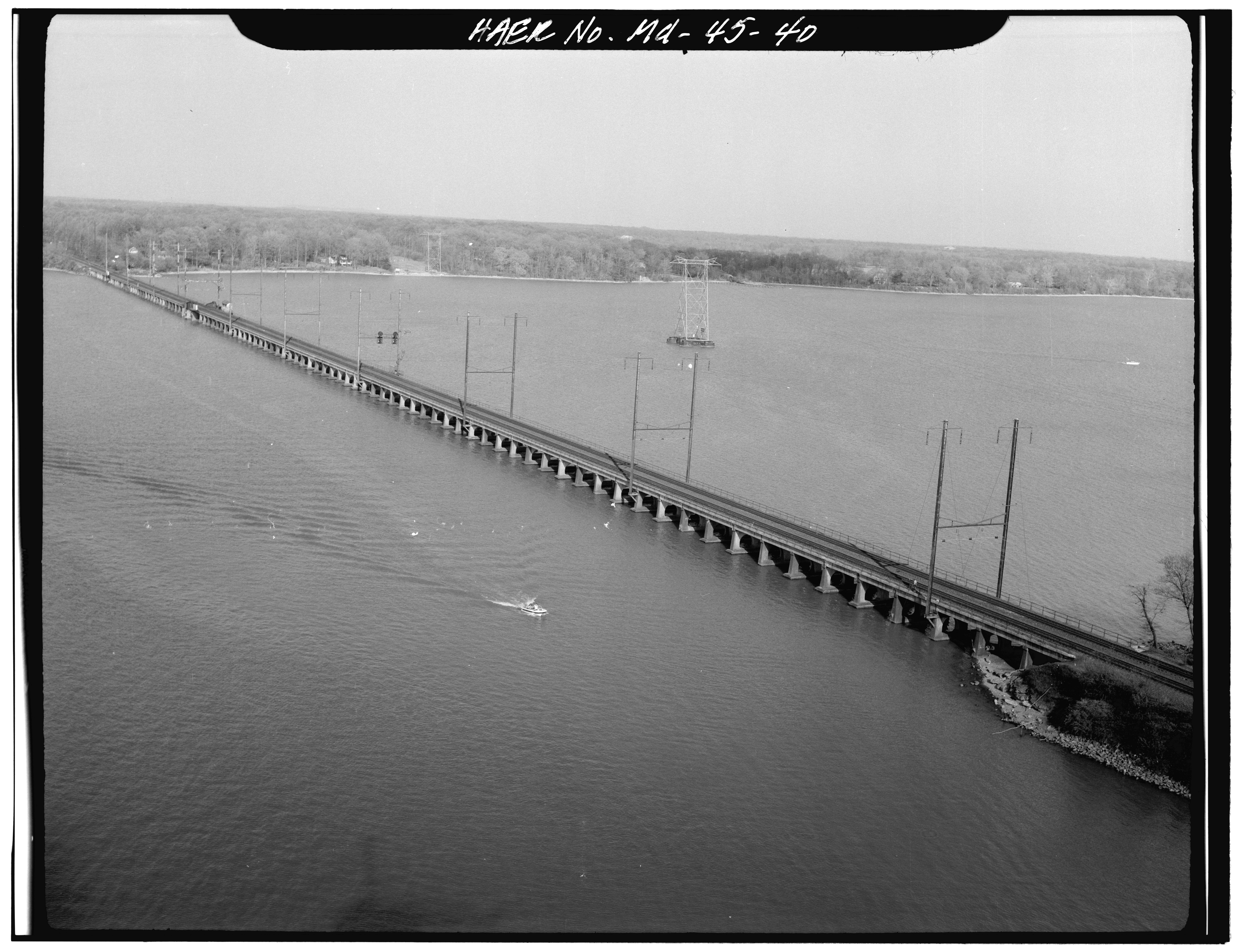
Amtrak bridge crossing Bush River in 1977

Bush River is a tidal estuary in Harford County, Maryland, located about 15 mi (24 km) northeast of Baltimore. The estuary extends southward from the community of Riverside for about 9 mi (14 km) to the Chesapeake Bay. The watershed area of tidal Bush River is 125 mi^{2} (320 km^{2}), and includes Aberdeen Proving Ground, a military facility.

== Tributaries ==
Bush River has three principal tributaries: Bush Creek, Church Creek and Otter Point Creek. The smaller tributaries are:

- Abbey Creek
- Bear Cabin Branch
- Bread and Cheese Branch
- Broad Run
- Bynum Run
- Cod Creek
- Coopers Creek
- Cranberry Run
- Deep Spring Branch
- East Branch
- Elbow Brook
- Grays Run
- Haha Branch
- Heavenly Waters
- High Bridge Branch
- Hoops Branch
- James Run
- Kings Creek
- Lauderick Creek
- Long Branch
- Monks Creek
- Mountain Branch
- Plumtree Run
- Sod Run
- West Branch
- Winters Run

== See also ==
- List of Maryland rivers
