= Bird River (Maryland) =

Location
- Country: United States
- State: Maryland
- District: Baltimore County

Physical characteristics
- Source
  - coordinates: 39°24′5″N 76°25′57″W
  - elevation: 134 ft (41 m)
- Mouth: Gunpowder River
  - coordinates: 39°23′7″N 76°21′17″W
  - elevation: 0 ft (0 m)

Basin features
- Tributaries
  - right: Whitemarsh Run; Windlass Run; Railroad Creek

The Bird River is a tidal river in eastern Baltimore County in the U.S. state of Maryland. The Bird River empties into the Gunpowder River.

== See also ==
- List of Maryland rivers
