= Rock Run (Potomac River tributary) =

Tributary of the Potomac River in Maryland

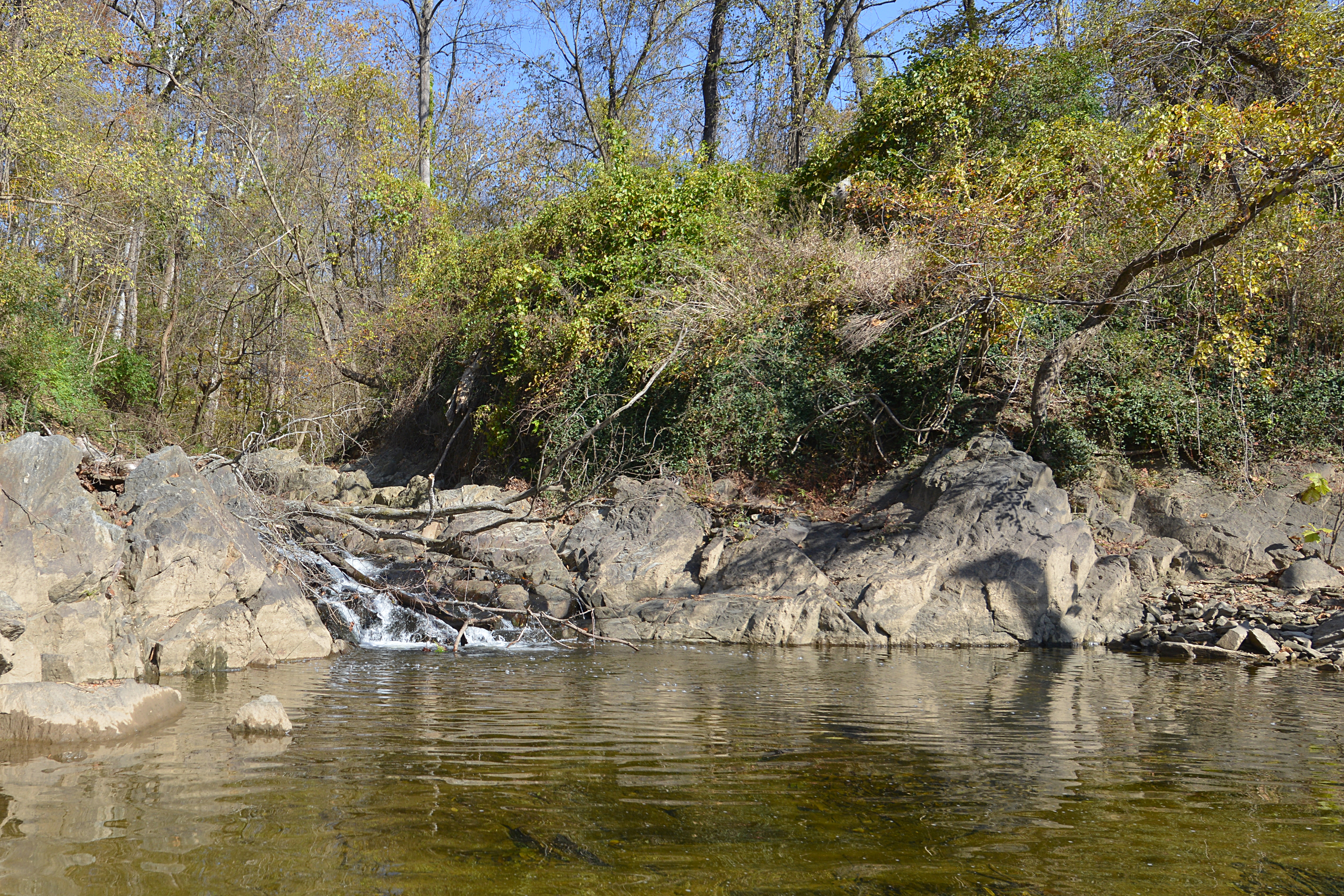
- Rock Run at its confluence with the Potomac River

Location
- Country: United States
- State: Maryland
- County: Montgomery

Physical characteristics
- Source
  - location: Potomac, Maryland
- Mouth: Potomac River
  - location: Carderock, Maryland
  - coordinates: 38.969742°N 77.184333°W
- Length: 5.3 mi (8.5 km)

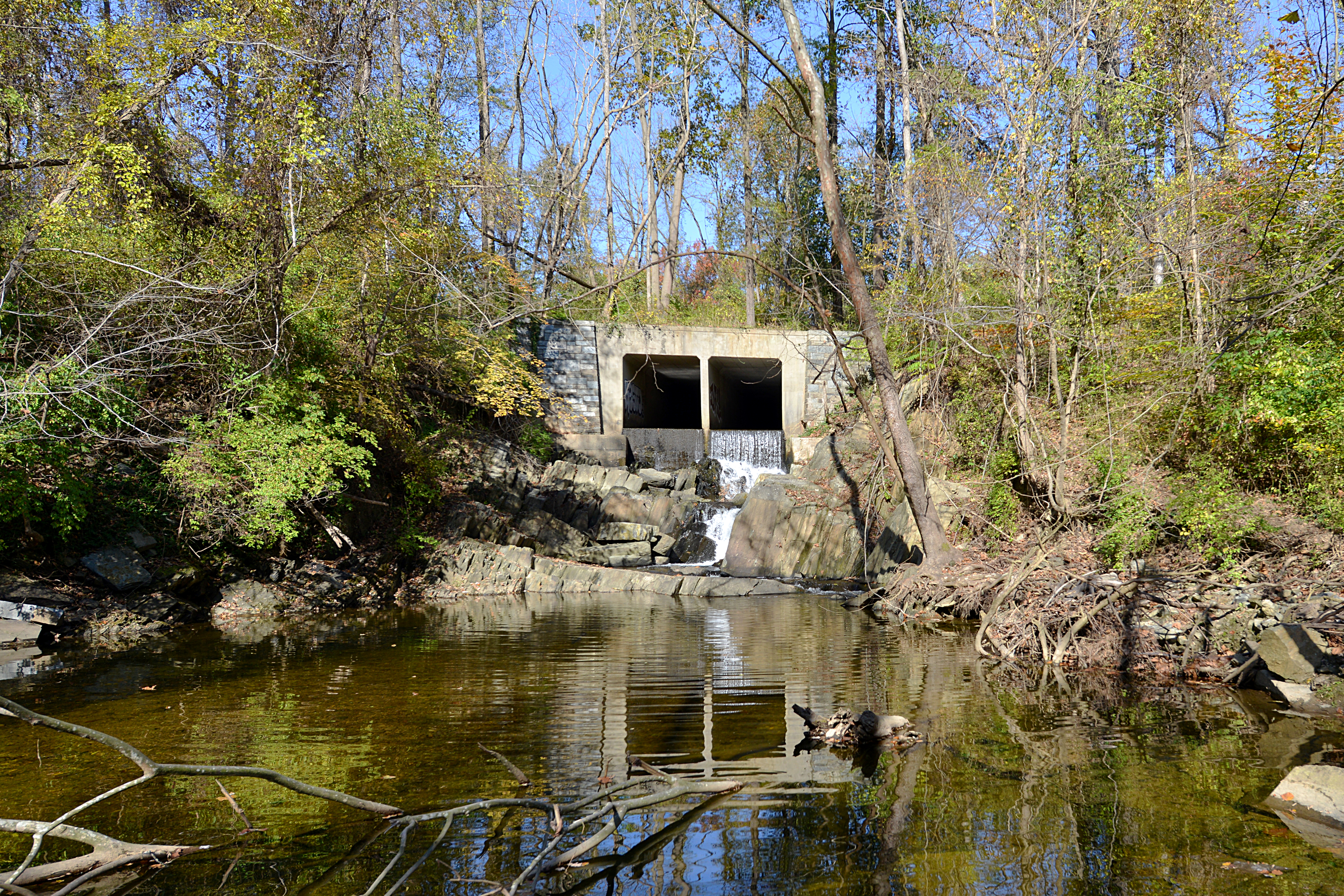
Rock Run where it crosses under the C & O Canal

Rock Run is a tributary stream of the Potomac River in Montgomery County, Maryland. The headwaters of the stream rise in the village of Potomac, and the creek flows southeast for 5.3 miles (8.5 km) to the Potomac River.

A portion of the stream runs through Rock Run Stream Valley Park, an undeveloped park that is part of the Montgomery County MD park system.

== See also ==
- List of rivers of Maryland
