= Tally Lake =

- Location within Montana Location within the United States
- Location: Flathead County, Montana
- Coordinates: 48°24′09″N 114°33′27″W
- Type: lake
- Basin countries: United States
- Surface area: 1,211 acres (490 ha)
- Average depth: 239 ft (73 m)
- Max. depth: 495 ft (151 m)
- Water volume: 290,170 acre-feet (357,920,000 m^{3})
- Surface elevation: 3,356 ft (1,023 m)

Tally Lake is a freshwater lake located in Flathead County, Montana in the northwestern region of the United States. The lake is about 10 miles (16 km) west of the town of Whitefish. It is a popular lake for recreational activities including fishing, boating, swimming and cliff jumping, and hiking on the surrounding trails, and is notable for its great depth and unusual geology.

== Description ==
The lake's surface area is 1,211 acres (490 ha). The lake is located at 3,356 feet (1,023 m) above sea level. It is 495 feet (151 m) deep at its deepest point, making it the deepest lake in Montana. Despite its large volume, the lake tends to be warm in late summer because its waters are darkly colored due to high levels of tannins (which are harmless). These cause the lake to absorb and retain more heat than comparatively clearer bodies of water in the region.

Tally Lake is home to a number of fish species which make it a popular site for fishing. These include whitefish, perch, and brook, lake and rainbow trout.

== Tributaries ==
- Logan Creek
  - Griffin Creek
    - McGovern Creek
    - Hand Creek
    - Sheppard Creek
      - Dunsire Creek
      - Listle Creek
      - Sinclair Creek
      - Swaney Creek
      - Swanson Creek
  - Oettiker Creek
  - Reid Creek
- Stillwater River

== See also ==
- List of lakes in Flathead County, Montana (M-Z)
