= Little Tonoloway Creek (Pennsylvania) =

River in Pennsylvania, United States

Coordinates: 39.87990°N 78.22175°W

Little Tonoloway Creek is a 20.2-mile-long (32.5 km) tributary of Tonoloway Creek in Fulton County, Pennsylvania in the United States.

Little Tonoloway Creek joins Tonoloway Creek approximately 5.5 miles (8.9 km) upstream of the Potomac River.

Another Little Tonoloway Creek exists just 3 miles (5 km) to the south in Maryland, flowing directly into the Potomac River at Hancock.

== See also ==
- List of rivers of Pennsylvania
