= Broad Run (Maryland) =

Tributary of the Potomac River in Maryland, US

Coordinates: 39.113717°N 77.4861°W

Broad Run is a tributary stream of the Potomac River in Montgomery County, Maryland. The headwaters of the stream originate west of the town of Poolesville, and the creek flows southward for 8.9 miles (14.3 km) to the Potomac River. The Broad Run and its watershed are almost entirely within the Montgomery County Agricultural Reserve.

== Tributaries of Broad Run ==
- Wasche Road Tributary
- Big John Run

== See also ==
- Broad Run (Loudoun County, Virginia)
- List of Maryland rivers
