= Broad Creek, Prince George's County, Maryland =

Historic district in Maryland, United States

- Broad Creek Historic District
- U.S. National Register of Historic Places
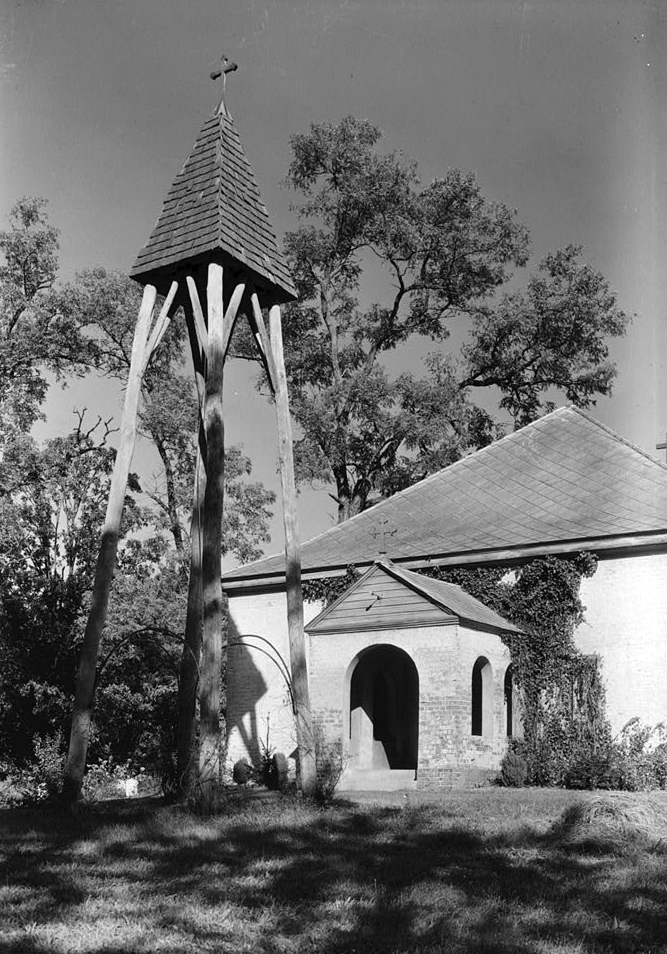
- Broad Creek Church

- Location within Maryland Location within the United States
- Nearest city: Friendly, Maryland
- Coordinates: 38°45′28″N 76°59′49″W
- Architectural style: Georgian
- NRHP reference No.: 11000881
- Added to NRHP: December 8, 2011

Broad Creek in Prince George's County was the first footprint of European settlement in the immediate counties around what would become the nation's capital, Washington, D.C. The area is part of greater Fort Washington.

The area was settled by Europeans in the 1660s and the town was created in 1706 when the colonial Maryland Legislature authorized surveying and laying out the towns of Queen Anne Town, Nottingham, Mill Town, Piscataway, Aire (also known as Broad Creek) and Upper Marlboro (then known as Marlborough Town).

In 1747, the legislature tried to improve the quality and the method of marketing tobacco, then the major crop of the area, and established a formal system of tobacco inspection and quality control. The town was home to one of seven state tobacco warehouses built in Prince George's County.

The site is located 9 miles (14 km) south of the U.S. Capitol building on the Potomac River. Today, this "first footprint" of settlement in the capital area is a Prince George's County Historic District, with three 17th-century homesites and an 18th-century Episcopal church structure. The Broad Creek Historic District comprises 900 acres (3.6 km^{2}) along the Potomac River, and is remarkable for its environmental resources, as well as its 12,000-year-old Indian archeological discoveries.

It was placed on the National Register of Historic Places on December 8, 2011.

== Broad Creek and Henson Creek ==
The stream named Broad Creek is a tributary of the Potomac River (Mouth: 38.7509477°N 77.0266428°W). Henson Creek is a tributary of Broad Creek (Mouth: 38.7612253°N 77.0008087°W). The 5.7 mile long Henson Creek Trail is managed by the Maryland-National Capital Park and Planning Commission.
