= Slaughter Creek (South Dakota) =

Stream in South Dakota, United States

Coordinates: 42°54′51″N 98°22′16″W

Slaughter Creek is a stream in the U.S. state of South Dakota.

Slaughter Creek has the name of a local pioneer.

== See also ==
- List of rivers of South Dakota
