= Watts Branch (Missouri) =

Stream in the American state of Missouri

Coordinates: 39.080936°N 91.850995°W

Watts Branch is a stream in Audrain County in the U.S. state of Missouri. It is a tributary of the South Fork of the Salt River.

Watts Branch has the name of George Watta, a local pioneer.

== See also ==
- List of rivers of Missouri
