= Deep Run (Patapsco River tributary) =

River in Maryland, United States

Coordinates: 39°12′48.7″N 76°41′46.5″W

Physical characteristics
- Mouth
  - location: Patapsco River
- Length: 11.9 mi (19.2 km)

Basin features
- River system: Patapsco River
- Tributaries
  - left: Bascom Creek
  - right: Piny Run

Deep Run (Earth)
Deep Run (the United States)
Deep Run (Maryland)

Deep Run is an 11.9-mile-long (19.2 km) tributary of the Patapsco River in central Maryland in the United States. The main stem arises in the vicinity of Ellicott City, starting in the Montgomery Meadows housing development, and the lower course forms part of the border between Howard and Anne Arundel Counties. It passes underneath Route 100 twice, Interstate 95 once, and Route 1 once as well.

Archeological digs in 1929 discovered arrowheads, spearpoints, axes, and gorgets along the Disney farm. The banks of the Deep Run were a regular hiding place for slaves travelling north with the assistance of Harriet Tubman. The area was rezoned by the Howard County Department of Planning and Zoning to be unpreserved for historical status and is now occupied by commercial buildings along Hi Tech drive and Oxford Square development.
