= Mill Branch site =

The Mill Branch archaeological site is located in Warren County, Georgia west of Augusta and south of Thomson. It is located in the Brier Creek watershed. A reservoir was deemed necessary to assist in kaolin processing during times of drought. For this project to commence, a permit was needed from the Corps of Engineers, which required a cultural resource impact study to first be done. J.M. Huber Corporation contracted Southeastern Archaeological Services to do an initial survey of the area in 1988 with additional data recovery in 1990. J.M Huber Corporation determined that two sites surveyed by Southeastern Archaeological Services, specifically 9WR4 and 9WR11, could not be avoided or preserved. Huber no longer owns this property. These two sites were excavated between April 23 and May 31, 1990. The field report, Archaeological Investigations at Mill Branch Sites 9WR4 and 9WR11 Warren County, Georgia, was published in 1995 and compiled by R. Jerald Ledbetter.

== 9WR4 ==
Site 9WR4 was located on the west bank of Brier Creek with the northern boundary set by Little Brier Creek. The site measured about 1.20 hectares in size. 9WR4 was divided into northern, southern, and southeastern areas due to topography. This site was excavated in all three sections using heavy machinery in conjunction with manual spadework. A smooth bucket backhoe was used to excavate a total of eighteen trenches as well as a 20 m x 20 m block and a 25 m x 25 m block. The trenches were then cleaned and smoothed by hand trowel. Artifacts emphasizing the Early Archaic, Middle Archaic, Early Woodland, and Middle Woodland periods were identified. Five types of features were found throughout 9WR4: unlined midden pits, rock lined midden pits, rock clusters, post molds, and an early dwelling.

== Pit House ==
A feature described as "the single most important discovery on 9WR4" was found in the southern section. This feature was a Late Archaic midden filled pit house. Charcoal found in the hearth was radiocarbon dated to 1900-1950 B.C. The distribution of artifacts suggested that the artifacts were accumulated over time, and not used as fill after abandonment of the dwelling. This large rectangular feature measured about 5m x 4m x 35 cm and had a volume of about 5650 liters. There was no evidence of multiple structures present at one time.

== 9WR11 ==
Site 9WR11 was located to the south of 9WR4 and just across Mill Branch which forms the northern border of the site. The site measured to about 1.20 hectares making this site about the same size as 9WR4, but due to a mature hardwood presence, fewer blocks were excavated. This site was surveyed using a systematic series of shovel tests, and then heavy machinery was used to clear four trenches to a maximum depth of 40 cm except for Trench 1 which was dug to a maximum of 1.2 m. A smooth backhoe was used to create the trenches, and they were all 3 m wide and ranged in length from 9 m - 22.5 m. Trench 3 was expanded into an excavation block. 9WR11 was a Late Archaic primary lithic workshop site. The majority of the artifacts found were lithic. Some pottery was found from later periods suggesting that the site may have been used as a secondary workshop in later periods.
