= Watts Branch (Anacostia River tributary) =

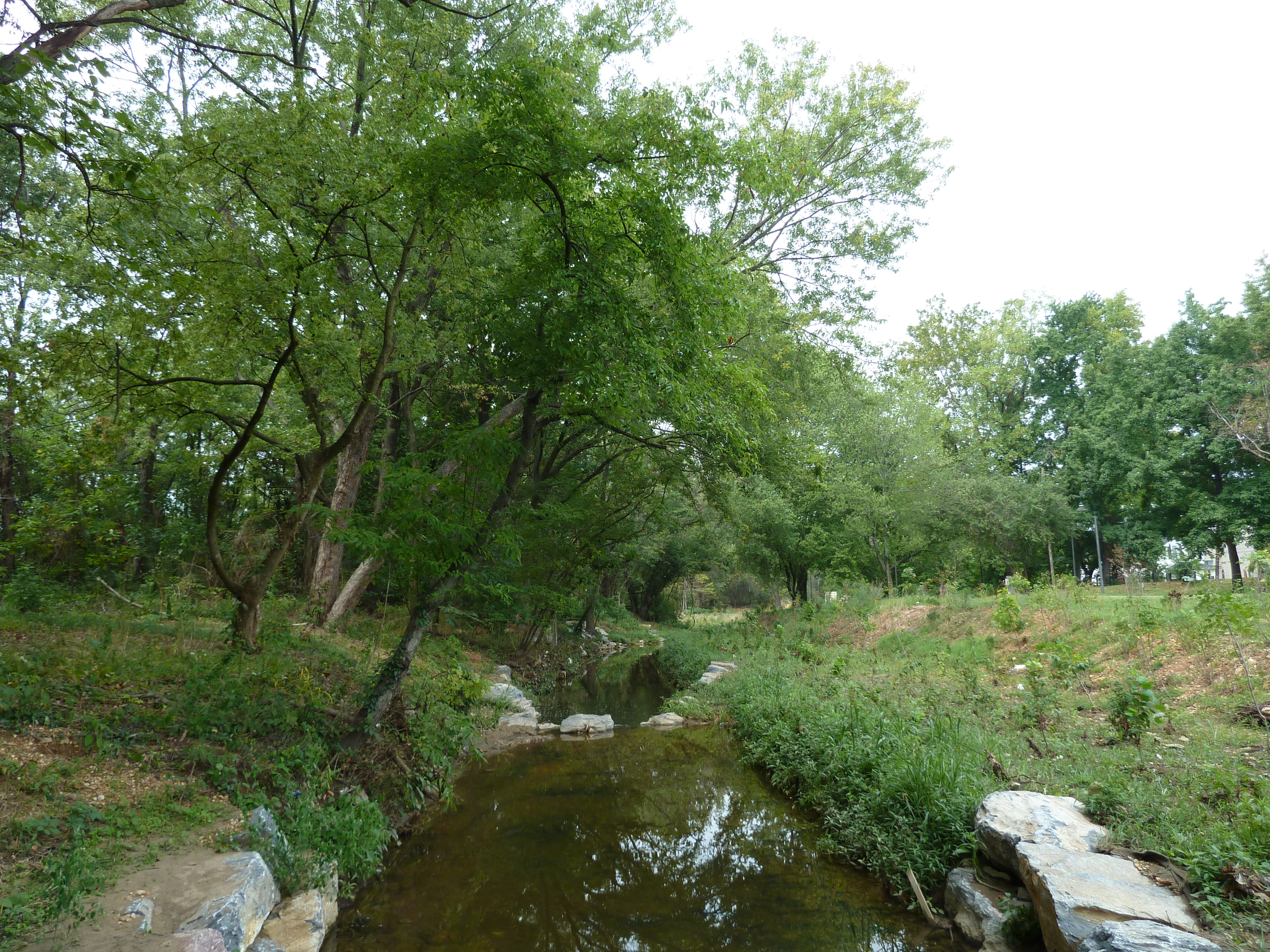
- A restored portion of Watts Branch in 2011

Location
- States: Maryland
- County: Prince George's County, Maryland
- City: Washington, D.C.

Physical characteristics
- Source
  - coordinates: 38.8706432°N 76.9045399°W
- Mouth
  - location: Anacostia River
  - coordinates: 38.905706°N 76.957115°W
- Length: 4.9 miles (7.9 km)
- Basin size: 11,500 acres (47 km^{2})

Basin features
- River system: Potomac River

Watts Branch is a tributary stream of the Anacostia River in Prince George's County, Maryland, and Washington, D.C.

== Course ==
The headwaters of the stream originate in the Capitol Heights area of Prince George's County, and the branch flows roughly northwest for 4.9 miles (7.9 km) to the Anacostia, which drains to the Potomac River and the Chesapeake Bay. The watershed area of Watts Branch is about 6,000 acres (24 km^{2}) in Prince George's County and 5,500 acres (22 km^{2}) in Washington.

== Water quality ==
Watts Branch is in a highly urbanized area, and its water quality has been rated as poor by government agencies. The stream has been polluted by urban runoff (stormwater), dumped trash and leaking sewer pipes. Much of the stream is in concrete channels or culverts. A variety of stream cleanup and restoration projects have been initiated by D.C. government, the United States Environmental Protection Agency (EPA) and other federal agencies, in cooperation with community organizations such as the Anacostia Riverkeeper, the Anacostia Watershed Society, Groundwork Anacostia, and the Watts Branch Community Alliance.

== See also ==
- Watts Branch (Potomac River)
- List of District of Columbia rivers
- List of Maryland rivers
