= Mill Branch (Clear Creek tributary) =

Stream in the American state of Missouri

Coordinates: 37.777261°N 94.130499°W

Mill Branch is a stream in Vernon County in the U.S. state of Missouri.

Mill Branch was so named on account of a mill pond near its course.

== See also ==
- List of rivers of Missouri
