= Mill Branch (Patuxent River tributary) =

Stream in Maryland

Coordinates: 38°55′26.9″N 76°42′34.5″W

Mill Branch of the Patuxent River in Prince George's County, Maryland is part of the Upper Patuxent Watershed.

There is record of a Reuben Ross owning a water mill on the Patuxent River, possibly near this branch. He died in 1722.

== Drainage area ==
Mill Branch drains 2270 acres including the communities of Evergreen, The Willows, Evergreen Estates, St. James Place, Enfield Chase, Covington, Archstone at Bowie Town Center, Glen Allen, Oaktree, Lake Village Manor, Amber Meadows, and Pointer Ridge within Bowie, Maryland.

== Environmental concerns ==
The major pollutants in this stream are sediment and excess nutrients (fertilizer from nearby homes).

== See also ==
- List of rivers of Maryland
