= Frog Mortar Creek =

Location
- Country: United States
- State: Maryland
- District: Baltimore County

Physical characteristics
- Source
  - coordinates: 39°20′37″N 76°23′58″W
  - elevation: 30 ft (9.1 m)
- Mouth: Middle River (Maryland)
  - coordinates: 39°18′37″N 76°24′16″W
  - elevation: 0 ft (0 m)

Frog Mortar Creek is a tidal creek in Baltimore County, Maryland. The creek empties into the Middle River and surrounds the northeast and southeast sides of Martin State Airport.

== See also ==
- List of Maryland rivers
