= Little Monocacy River =

Tributary of the Potomac River in Maryland, US

Coordinates: 39.218437°N 77.456654°W

The Little Monocacy River is a 10.1-mile-long (16.3 km) tributary stream of the Potomac River. Despite its name, the stream does not feed into the Monocacy River. The Little Monocacy is located almost entirely in Montgomery County, Maryland, and enters the Potomac just downstream from where the Monocacy enters the Potomac. Its headwaters rise southwest of Comus, and most of its approximately 17-square-mile (44 km^{2}) watershed is farmland and pasture (60.56%) or forested land (36.03%).

== See also ==
- List of Maryland rivers
