= Tonoloway Creek =

Stream in the U.S. states of Pennsylvania and Maryland

Coordinates: 39°41′48″N 78°9′29″W

Tonoloway Creek, also known as Great Tonoloway Creek, is a 31.4-mile-long (50.5 km) tributary stream of the Potomac River in the U.S. states of Maryland and Pennsylvania.

Tonoloway Creek empties into the Potomac River at Hancock, Maryland.

== Tributaries ==
(travelling upstream)

- Little Tonoloway Creek, approximately 5.5 miles (8.9 km) upstream of the Potomac River

== See also ==
- List of Maryland rivers
- List of rivers of Pennsylvania
