= Watts Branch (Potomac River tributary) =

Tributary stream of the Potomac River in Montgomery County, Maryland, United States

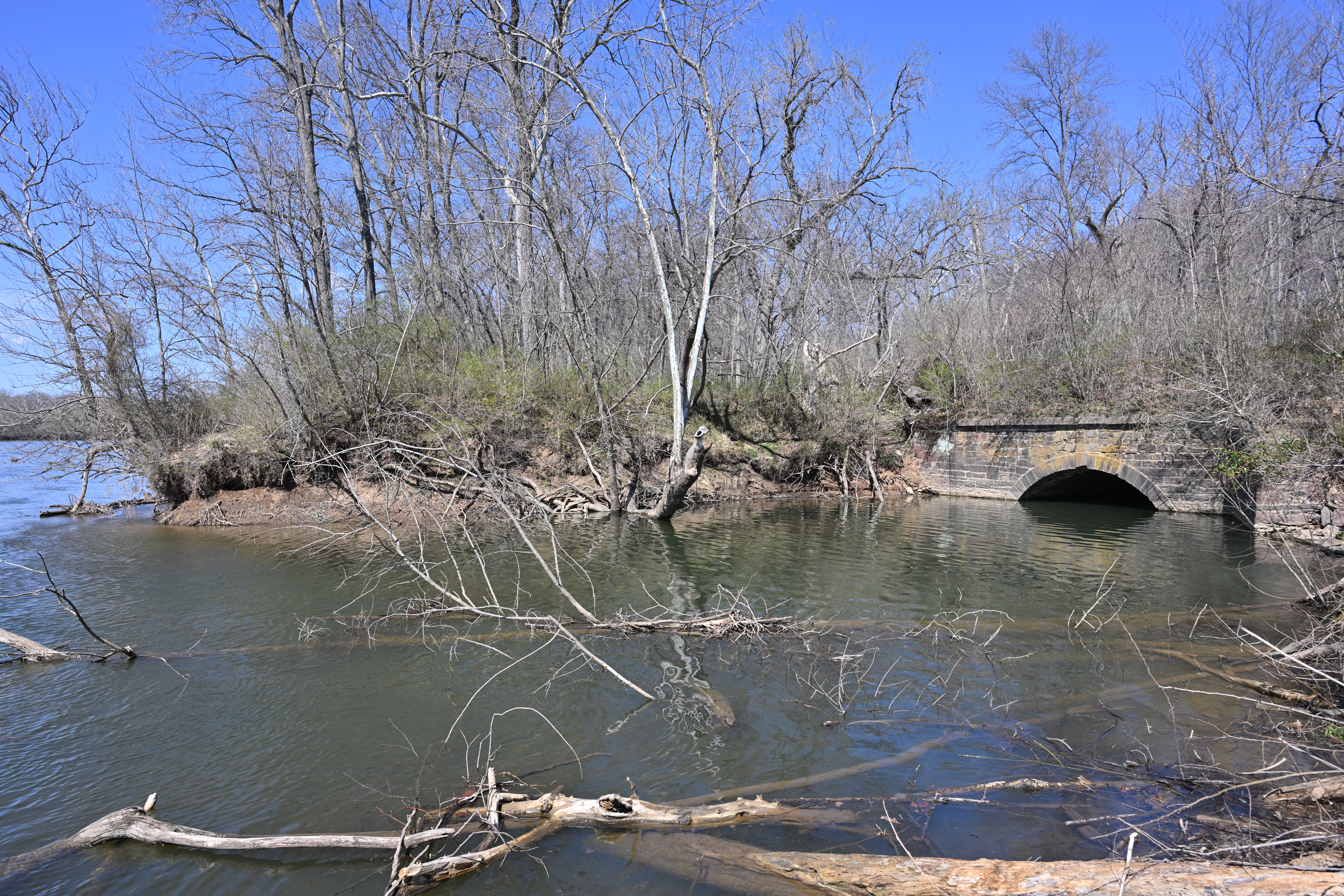

- Location of the mouth in Maryland

Location
- Country: United States
- State: Maryland

Physical characteristics
- Source
  - location: Rockville, Maryland
  - coordinates: 39.0967748°N 77.1572024°W
- Mouth: Potomac River
  - location: Montgomery County, Maryland
  - coordinates: 39.0398312°N 77.2599817°W
  - elevation: 167 ft (51 m)
- Length: 11.2 mi (18.0 km)
- Basin size: 22 sq mi (57 km^{2})

Basin features
- Tributaries
  - left: Fallsmead, Horizon Hill, Cold Spring, Fallsreach, Kilgour Branch
  - right: Research Blvd., Lakewood, Valley Dr., Piney Branch, Sandy Branch

Watts Branch is a tributary stream of the Potomac River in Montgomery County, Maryland.

== Course ==
The headwaters of the stream originate in the city of Rockville, and the branch flows southwest for 11.2 miles (18.0 km), under the C&O Canal near Swain's Lock, to the Potomac River, which drains to the Chesapeake Bay. The watershed area is about 22 square miles (57 km^{2}).

Portions of Watts Branch flow through a stream valley park, a mostly undeveloped natural area which acts as a riparian buffer zone to help minimize stream bank erosion and filter pollutants from stormwater runoff.

== Development impacts on water quality ==
While some parts of the Watts Branch watershed are parkland or remain forested, the area is adjacent to Rockville town center and the Interstate 270 corridor. This community has experienced extensive residential and commercial development over the past several decades. Population in the Rockville city limits (of which only a portion is in the Watts Branch watershed) more than doubled between 1960 and 2010, from approximately 26,000 to 61,000. These development trends have led to degraded water quality due to stormwater pollution in some portions of the Watts Branch mainstem and tributaries. The stream and watershed have been the subject of extensive studies and planning by Montgomery County and the City of Rockville. A number of stream restoration projects have been undertaken by both governments.

In order to preserve water quality in a partially developed area, the county imposed some restrictions on development (i.e. designation of a "Special Protection Area") in part of the Piney Branch sub-watershed in 1994. Following intensive land development after 1998, county scientists found that the special restrictions had only a limited effect, and water quality declined where development had occurred.

== Tributaries of Watts Branch ==
Major tributaries of Watts Branch include:

- Research Boulevard Tributary
- Valley Drive Tributary
- Cold Spring Tributary
- Fallsreach Tributary
- Potomac Green Tributary
- Kilgour Branch
- Potomac View Branch
- Piney Branch
- Piney Glen Tributary
- Greenbriar Branch
- Sandy Branch

== See also ==
- List of Maryland rivers
- Watts Branch (Anacostia River)
