= Slaughter Creek (Maryland) =

Coordinates: 38°29′36″N 76°16′44″W

Location
- Country: United States
- State: Maryland
- Region: Taylors Island

Physical characteristics
- Source
  - location: Chesapeake Bay
- Length: 6.7 mi (10.8 km)

Basin features
- River system: Little Choptank River

Slaughter Creek is a 6.7-mile-long (10.8 km) saltwater creek that drains into the Little Choptank River. The creek is 0.3 miles (0.5 km) wide at its mouth. It separates Taylors Island, Maryland from the mainland.
