= Transquaking River =

River in Maryland, United States

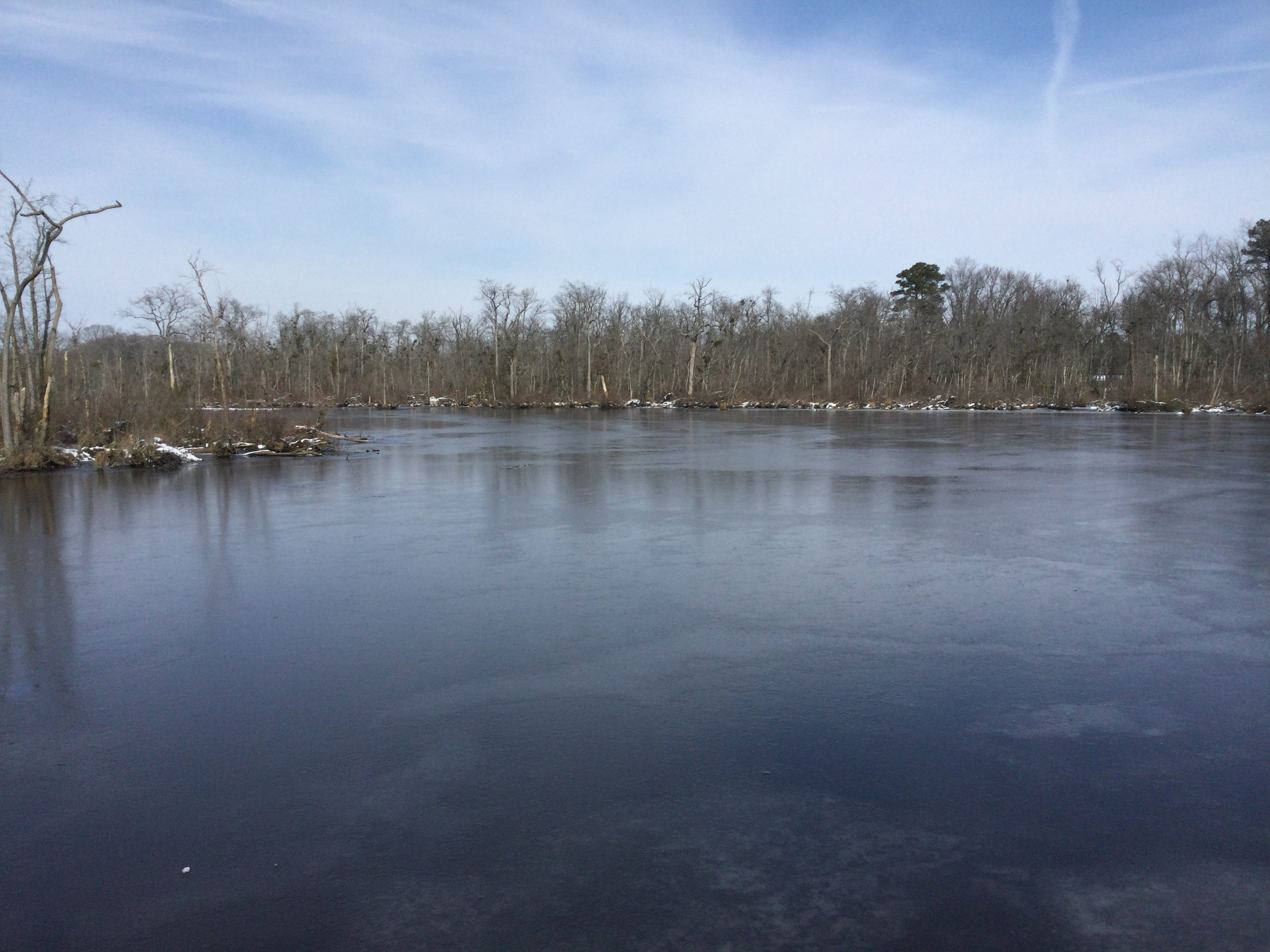
- Transquaking River facing north

- Location of the Transquaking River within Maryland

Location
- Country: United States
- State: Maryland
- County: Dorchester County

Physical characteristics
- Source
  - coordinates: 38.5949°N 75.9193°W
  - elevation: 39 feet (12 m)
- Mouth
  - coordinates: 38.3692°N 76.0011°W
  - elevation: 0 feet (0 m)
- Length: 23.2 miles (37.3 km)
- Basin size: 110.8 square miles (287 km^{2})
- Depth
  - minimum: 4 inches (10 cm)
  - maximum: 11.5 feet (3.5 m)

The Transquaking River is a 23.2-mile-long (37.3 km) river on the southern part of the Eastern Shore of Maryland in the United States. It starts in northern Dorchester County and flows south-southwest ending just outside of the Blackwater National Wildlife Refuge, approximately 2,828 feet (862 m) wide at its mouth on the north bank of the Fishing Bay, near the Chesapeake Bay to the southwest. The Transquaking River has a watershed area of about 110.8 square miles (287 km^{2}).

== 2021 pollution incident ==
On December 21, 2021, the Maryland Department of the Environment (MDE) ordered Valley Proteins, an animal rendering and recycling company, to cease operations at their facility in Linkwood, Maryland, after exceeding the local wastewater discharge permit limits. The plant had consistently been dumping illegal amounts of fecal bacteria, ammonia, and phosphorus into the Transquaking River. During the summer of 2020, the plant exceeded ammonia pollution limits in the Transquaking River 25 times.

Maryland attorney general Brian Frosh stated: "Valley Proteins' own reports from 2019 to 2021 show that, on about 40 occasions, wastewater [the plant] discharged contained higher concentrations of ammonia, phosphorus and other pollutants than permitted — in one case about 725 times the limit."

Initially, the MDE offered $13 million in public funds to pay for a private wastewater treatment facility for Valley Proteins. After backlash from the public and several state senators including Sarah Elfreth and Paul Pinsky, the MDE withdrew the funding and stated that they would be imposing penalties on Valley Proteins for their illegal levels of pollution. Michael Smith, the vice chairman of Valley Proteins, stated that "[Valley Proteins is] working cooperatively with MDE to resolve the issue as quickly as possible."

== See also ==
- List of rivers in Maryland
