= Tuscarora Creek (Potomac River tributary) =

Tributary of the Potomac River in Frederick County, Maryland, U.S.

Coordinates: 39.243436°N 77.475265°W

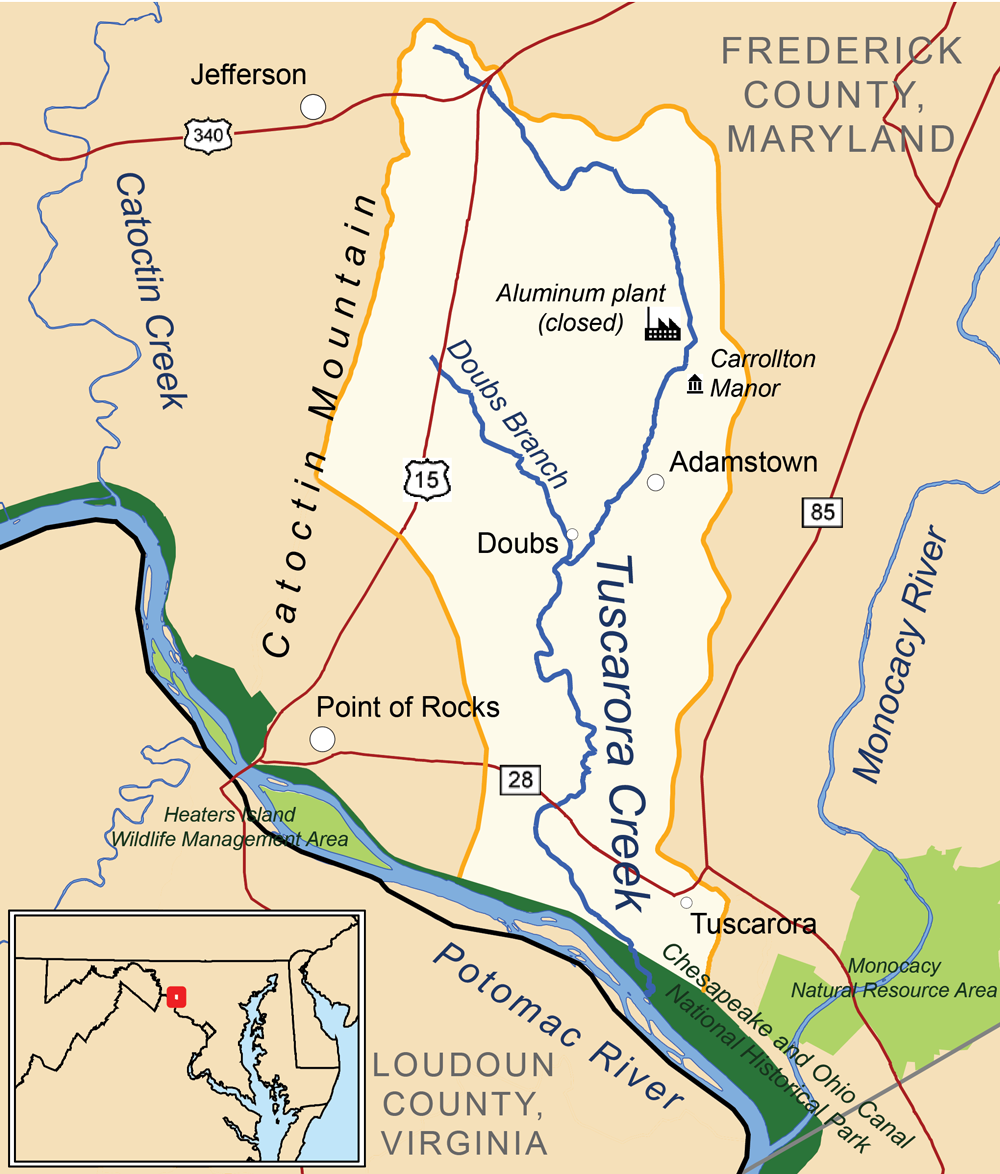
Map of the Tuscarora Creek drainage basin

Tuscarora Creek is a 12.8-mile-long (20.6 km) tributary of the Potomac River in Frederick County, Maryland, in the United States.

The creek rises east of the community of Jefferson, about 6.4 miles (10.3 km) southwest of the city of Frederick, and flows south to its mouth at the Potomac.

== See also ==
- Tuscarora Creek (Monocacy River)
- List of rivers of Maryland
