= Tommy Wright Branch =

Stream in Maryland, USA

Tommy Wright Branch Tributary to Marshyhope Creek
- Location of Tommy Wright Branch mouth Tommy Wright Branch (the United States)

Location
- Country: United States
- State: Maryland
- County: Caroline

Physical characteristics
- Source: Mill Creek divide
  - location: about 0.75 miles north-northeast of Concord, Maryland
  - coordinates: 38°48′47.41″N 075°46′48.76″W
  - elevation: 55 ft (17 m)
- Mouth: Marshyhope Creek
  - location: about 2.5 miles southwest of Smithville, Maryland
  - coordinates: 38°45′30.41″N 075°44′19.75″W
  - elevation: 16 ft (4.9 m)
- Length: 5.99 mi (9.64 km)
- Basin size: 12.56 square miles (32.5 km^{2})
- Discharge
  - location: Marshyhope Creek
  - average: 14.73 cu ft/s (0.417 m^{3}/s) at mouth with Marshyhope Creek

Basin features
- Progression: Marshyhope Creek → Nanticoke River → Chesapeake Bay → Atlantic Ocean
- River system: Nanticoke River
- Tributaries
  - left: Smithville Ditch
  - right: unnamed tributaries
- Waterbodies: Smithville Lake
- Bridges: Trice Road, Possum Hill Road, Bloomery Road

Tommy Wright Branch is a 5.99 mi (9.64 km) long third-order tributary to Marshyhope Creek in Caroline County, Maryland. This is the only stream of this name in the United States.

== Course ==
Tommy Wright Branch rises about 0.75 miles (1.21 km) north-northeast of Concord, Maryland and then flows southeast and turns southwest to join Marshyhope Creek about 2 miles (3.2 km) southwest of Smithville, Maryland.

== Watershed ==
Tommy Wright Branch drains 12.56 square miles (32.5 km^{2}) of area, receives about 44.6 in/year of precipitation, and is about 11.68% forested.

== See also ==
- List of Maryland rivers
