= Little Conococheague Creek =

Creek

Coordinates: 39.603707°N 77.907775°W

Little Conococheague Creek is a 12.4-mile-long (20.0 km) tributary stream of the Potomac River in the U.S. states of Maryland and Pennsylvania. The stream rises on Two Top Mountain, west of the Whitetail Ski Resort in Franklin County, Pennsylvania, and proceeds south into Washington County, Maryland. It empties into the Potomac about 2 miles (3 km) southeast of Big Spring, Maryland. The watershed of the creek is 18 square miles (47 km^{2}) and includes Indian Springs Wildlife Management Area. Tributaries include Toms Run.

== See also ==
- List of rivers of Maryland
- List of rivers of Pennsylvania
