= Little Choptank River =

Location
- Country: United States
- State: Maryland
- Region: Delmarva Peninsula

Physical characteristics
- Source: Confluence of Lee Creek and Gary Creek
  - coordinates: 38°34′21″N 76°10′35″W
  - elevation: 0 ft (0 m)
- Mouth: Chesapeake Bay
  - coordinates: 38°32′34″N 76°19′21″W
  - elevation: 0 ft (0 m)

Basin features
- Tributaries
  - left: Fishing Creek; Woolford Creek; Parsons Creek; Slaughter Creek
  - right: Beckwith Creek; Phillips Creek; Hudson Creek; Brooks Creek

The Little Choptank River is a tidal river in Dorchester County in the U.S. state of Maryland. The river rises at the confluence of Lee Creek and Gary Creek 3 miles (4.8 km) west of Cambridge.

== See also ==
- List of Maryland rivers
