= Nanjemoy Creek =

- Mouth of the Nanjemoy Creek

Location
- Country: United States
- State: Maryland
- Counties: Charles County

Physical characteristics
- Source
  - location: Nanjemoy, Maryland
  - coordinates: 38.3987656°N 77.2080826°W
- Mouth
  - location: Mathias Point, Potomac River
  - coordinates: 38°26′19″N 77°8′17″W
  - elevation: 0 feet (0 m)
- Length: 13.1 miles (21.1 km)

Basin features
- River system: Potomac River

Nanjemoy Creek is a 13.1-mile-long (21.1 km) tidal tributary of the Potomac River in Charles County, Maryland, United States, located between Cedar Point Neck and Tayloe's Neck. Its watershed area (excluding water) is 73 square miles (190 km^{2}), with 2% impervious surface in 1994.

The Nature Conservancy established its Nanjemoy Creek Preserve in 1978, which protects more than 3,510 acres (1,420 ha) in the watershed. There is a large great blue heron rookery located at Nanjemoy Creek.

Blossom Point, a part of Harry Diamond Laboratories, and operated by the U.S. Army, is located on Cedar Point Neck, and unexploded ordnance (UXO) may be present within firing fans, which extend into both Nanjemoy Creek and the Potomac River.

The rural community of Nanjemoy is in the area around Nanjemoy Creek.

== Variant names ==
The following variant names have been listed on the Geographic Names Information System by the United States Geological Survey.

- Auon Riuer
- Avon Creek
- Nancemy Creek
- Nangemie Creeke
- Nangemy Creeke
- Nanjamy Creeke
- Nanjemy Creek
- Nanjemy Creeke
- Nonjamy Creeke
- Nonjemy Creek

== See also ==
- List of Maryland rivers
