= Pomonkey Creek =

Coordinates: 38°38′24.4″N 77°5′49″W

Location
- Country: United States
- State: Maryland

Physical characteristics
- Mouth
  - location: Potomac River
  - elevation: 0 feet (0 m)
- Length: 1.8 mi (2.9 km)

Pomonkey Creek is a 1.8-mile-long (2.9 km) tidal tributary of the Potomac River, near Bryans Road, Maryland. It is named for the Pamunkey tribe of Native Americans that lived in the area.

== See also ==
- Pomonkey, Maryland
- Pamunkey Creek in Virginia
- (Pomonkey: tribe and place in Maryland vs. Pamunkey: tribe and place in Virginia)
