= St. Marys River (Maryland) =

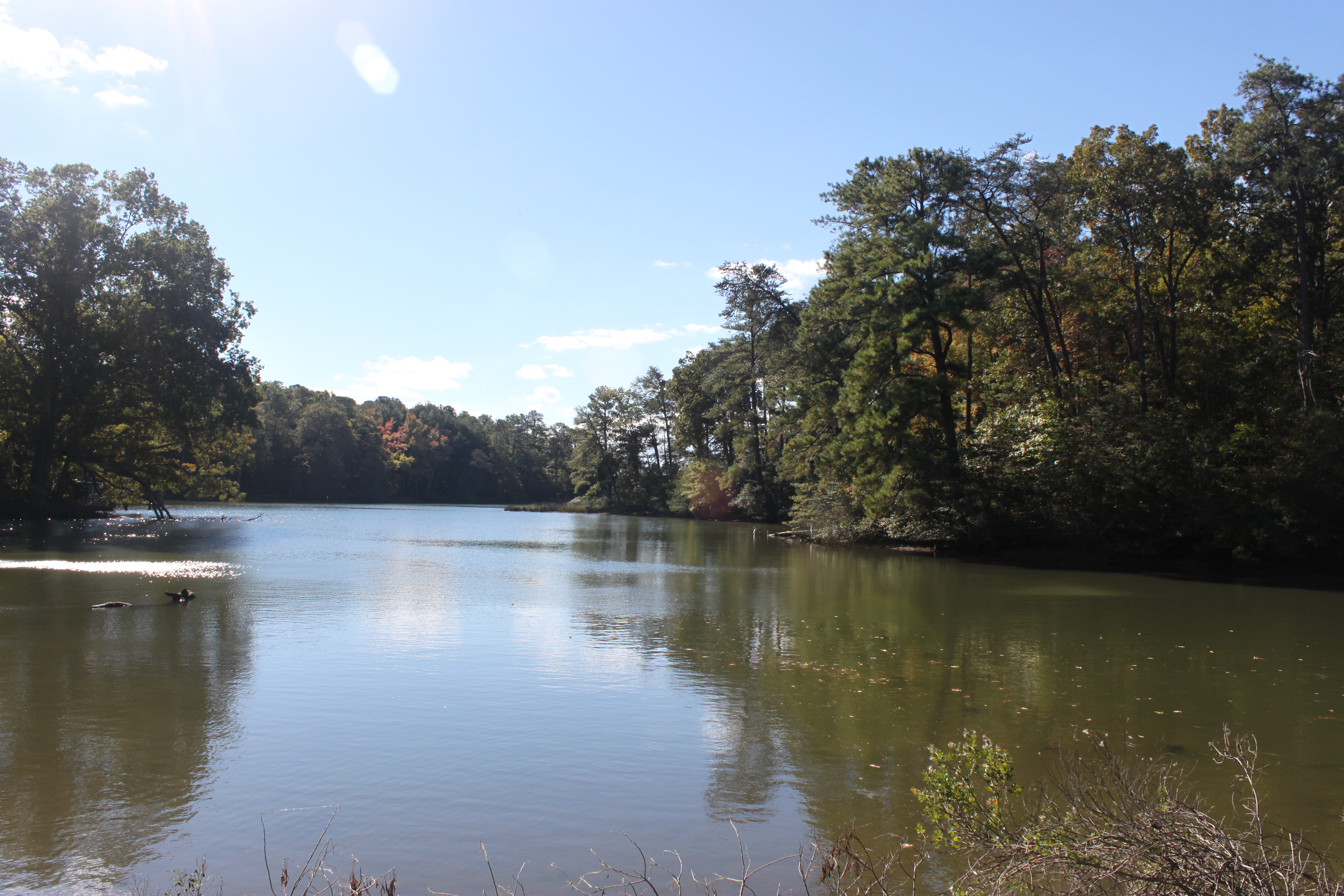
- A landscape image of the St. Marys River

Location
- Country: United States
- State: Maryland
- County: St. Mary's County

Physical characteristics
- Mouth
  - location: Potomac River
  - coordinates: 38°10′N 76°27′W
  - elevation: 0 feet (0 m)
- Length: 22.3 mi (35.9 km)

The St. Marys River (sometimes spelled St. Mary's River) is a 22.3-mile-long (35.9 km) river in southern Maryland in the United States. It rises in southern St. Mary's County, and flows to the southeast through Great Mills, widening into a tidal estuary near St. Mary's City, approximately 2 miles (3 km) wide at its mouth on the north bank of the Potomac River, near the Chesapeake Bay to the east.

== See also ==
- List of Maryland rivers
