= List of islands of Maryland =

Maryland has 281 named islands within its many waters and waterways, including the Atlantic Ocean; the Chesapeake Bay and its many tributary tidal rivers, creeks and bays; as well as within larger whitewater rivers like the upper Potomac.

These Islands are relatively permanent, although some are disappearing on the scale of a few centuries, like Smith Island in the Chesapeake Bay.

There are also a number of unnamed islands in Maryland, many of which are very temporary in nature, lasting only a few years or decades, both in the tidal environment and also in Maryland's larger whitewater rivers. These come and go due to the effect of storms.

This is a list of named islands of Maryland.

Islands of Maryland
County	Island	River/Bay	Type
Anne Arundel County	Big Island	Rhode River	R
Anne Arundel County	Brewers Island	Marley Creek	R
Anne Arundel County	Dobbins Island	Sillery Bay	
Anne Arundel County	Flat Island	Sellman Creek	R
Anne Arundel County	Gibson Island	Chesapeake Bay	
Anne Arundel County	Goose Island	South River	R
Anne Arundel County	High Island	Rhode River	R
Anne Arundel County	Little Island	Sillery Bay	
Anne Arundel County	Snake Island	Patuxent River	R
Anne Arundel County	St. Helena Island	Little Round Bay	
Anne Arundel County	The Hammocks Island	Main Creek	R
Anne Arundel County	Three Sisters Islands	Chesapeake Bay	
Anne Arundel County	Turkey Point Island	South River	R
Anne Arundel County	White Rocks Islands	Patapsco River	R
Baltimore County	Carroll Island	Gunpowder River	R
Baltimore County	Hart Island	Chesapeake Bay	
Baltimore County	Hart Miller Island	Chesapeake Bay	
Baltimore County	Hathaway Island	Patapsco River	R
Baltimore County	Pleasure Island	Chesapeake Bay	
Baltimore County	Sue Island	Middle River	R
Calvert County	Solomons Island (formerly Somervell's Island)	Patuxent River	R
Calvert County	Broomes Island	Patuxent River	R
Calvert County	Buzzard Island	Patuxent River	R
Calvert County	Hog Island	Chesapeake Bay	
Calvert County	Ma Leg Island	Patuxent River	R
Cecil County	Garrett Island	Susquehanna River	R
Cecil County	Hen Island	Sassafras River	R
Cecil County	Herring Island	Elk River	R
Cecil County	Indian Rock Island	Susquehanna River	R
Cecil County	Knight Island	Sassafras River	R
Cecil County	Long Island	Susquehanna River	R
Cecil County	Mills Island	Susquehanna River	R
Cecil County	Rough Island	Susquehanna River	R
Cecil County	Rowland Island	Susquehanna River	R
Cecil County	Spencer Island	Susquehanna River	R
Cecil County	Steels Island	Susquehanna River	R
Cecil County	Sterrett Island	Susquehanna River	R
Charles County	Cooksey Island	Wicomico River	R
Charles County	Chopawamsic Island	Potomac River	R
Charles County	Cobb Island	Potomac River	R
Charles County	Craney Island	Potomac River	R
Charles County	Wills Island	Port Tobacco River	R
Dorchester County	Adam Island	Holland Straits	
Dorchester County	Asquith Island	Honga River	R
Dorchester County	Axies Island	Nanticoke River	R
Dorchester County	Barren Island	Chesapeake Bay	
Dorchester County	Bettys Island	Blackwater River	R
Dorchester County	Billys Island	Honga River	R
Dorchester County	Bloodsworth Island	Chesapeake Bay	
Dorchester County	Bull Point Island	Meekins Creek	R
Dorchester County	Cattail Island	Chesapeake Bay	
Dorchester County	Chance Island	Transquaking River	R
Dorchester County	Cherry Island	Little Choptank River	R
Dorchester County	Clay Island	Fishing Bay	
Dorchester County	Dunnock Island	Dunnock Slough	?
Dorchester County	Elliott Island	Fishing Bay	
Dorchester County	Grays Island	Fishing Bay	
Dorchester County	Gunners Island	Chesapeake Bay	
Dorchester County	Hog Island	Hopper Straits	
Dorchester County	Holland Island	Chesapeake Bay	
Dorchester County	Hooper Island	Chesapeake Bay	
Dorchester County	James Island	Chesapeake Bay	
Dorchester County	Jenny Island	Chesapeake Bay	
Dorchester County	Langrells Island	Nanticoke River	R
Dorchester County	Long Island	Chesapeake Bay	
Dorchester County	Lower Hooper Island	Chesapeake Bay	
Dorchester County	Middle Hooper Island	Chesapeake Bay	
Dorchester County	Northeast Island	Chesapeake Bay	
Dorchester County	Opossum Island	Tar Bay	
Dorchester County	Pone Island	Chesapeake Bay	
Dorchester County	Poplar Island	Fishing Bay	
Dorchester County	Pot Island	Honga River	R
Dorchester County	Punch Island	Chesapeake Bay	
Dorchester County	Ragged Island	Little Choptank River	R
Dorchester County	Rowland Island	Blackwater River	R
Dorchester County	Sandy Island	Nanticoke River	R
Dorchester County	Sharpes Island	Chesapeake Bay	
Dorchester County	Snake Island	Fishing Bay	
Dorchester County	Spriggs Island	Blackwater River	R
Dorchester County	Spring Island	Holland Straits	
Dorchester County	Stingaree Island	Blackwater River	R
Dorchester County	Swan Island	Chesapeake Bay	
Dorchester County	Taylors Island	Chesapeake Bay	
Dorchester County	Upper Hooper Island	Chesapeake Bay	
Dorchester County	Woods Island	Blackwater River	R
Dorchester County	Woolford Island	Parsons Creek	R
Dorchester County	Wroten Island	Honga River	R
Frederick County	Cox Island	Potomac River	R
Frederick County	Heaters Island (formerly Conoy Island)	Potomac River	R
Frederick County	Mason Island	Potomac River	R
Frederick County	Nolands Island	Potomac River	R
Frederick County	Paton Island	Potomac River	R
Frederick County	Reed Island	Potomac River	R
Garrett County	Hamilton Island	Potomac River	
Harford County	Amos Island	Susquehanna River	R
Harford County	Dutch Island	Susquehanna River	R
Harford County	Hickorynut Island	Susquehanna River	R
Harford County	Meadow Island	Susquehanna River	R
Harford County	Monks Island	Chesapeake Bay	
Harford County	Monocacy Island	Chesapeake Bay	
Harford County	Mutton Islands	Susquehanna River	R
Harford County	Neds Island	Chesapeake Bay	
Harford County	Pooles Island	Chesapeake Bay	
Harford County	Robert Island	Susquehanna River	R
Harford County	Ross Island	Susquehanna River	R
Harford County	Rowland Island	Susquehanna River	R
Harford County	Snake Island	Susquehanna River	R
Harford County	Spencer Island	Susquehanna River	R
Harford County	Spesutie Island	Chesapeake Bay	
Harford County	Spry Island	Chesapeake Bay	
Harford County	St. Catherine Island	Susquehanna River	R
Harford County	Taylor Island	Chesapeake Bay	
Harford County	Tyding Island	Chesapeake Bay	
Harford County	Wood Island	Susquehanna River	R
Kent County	Cacaway Island	Langford Bay	
Kent County	Chase Island	Chester River	R
Kent County	Cockey Island	Chester River	R
Kent County	Eastern Neck Island	Chesapeake Bay	
Kent County	Little Neck Island	Chesapeake Bay	
Kent County	Millers Island	Chester River	R
Kent County	Pooles Island	Chesapeake Bay	
Kent County	Rush Island	Chesapeake Bay	
Montgomery County	Bealls Island	Potomac River	R
Montgomery County	Bear Island	Potomac River	R
Montgomery County	Cabin John Island	Potomac River	R
Montgomery County	Cedar Island	Potomac River	R
Montgomery County	Clagett Island	Potomac River	R
Montgomery County	Conn Island	Potomac River	R
Montgomery County	Elm Island	Potomac River	R
Montgomery County	Falls Island	Potomac River	R
Montgomery County	Gladys Island	Potomac River	R
Montgomery County	Grapevine Island	Potomac River	R
Montgomery County	Harrison Island	Potomac River	R
Montgomery County	Hermit Island	Potomac River	R
Montgomery County	Herzog Island	Potomac River	R
Montgomery County	High Island	Potomac River	R
Montgomery County	Katie Island	Potomac River	R
Montgomery County	Langly Island	Potomac River	R
Montgomery County	Mason Island	Potomac River	R
Montgomery County	Minnie Island	Potomac River	R
Montgomery County	Offutt Island	Potomac River	R
Montgomery County	Olmsted Island	Potomac River	R
Montgomery County	Perry Island	Potomac River	R
Montgomery County	Plummers Island	Potomac River	R
Montgomery County	Rocky Islands	Potomac River	R
Montgomery County	Rupert Island	Potomac River	R
Montgomery County	Scott Island	Potomac River	R
Montgomery County	Selden Island	Potomac River	R
Montgomery County	Sharpshin Island	Potomac River	R
Montgomery County	Sherwin Island (Cupids Bower)	Potomac River	R
Montgomery County	Snake Island	Potomac River	R
Montgomery County	Swainson Island	Potomac River	R
Montgomery County	Sycamore Island	Potomac River	R
Montgomery County	Tenfoot Island	Potomac River	R
Montgomery County	Torpedo Island	Potomac River	R
Montgomery County	Trammel Island	Potomac River	R
Montgomery County	Turkey Island	Potomac River	R
Montgomery County	Van Deventers Island	Potomac River	R
Montgomery County	Vaso Island	Potomac River	R
Montgomery County	Wades Island	Potomac River	R
Montgomery County	Watkins Island	Potomac River	R
Queen Anne's County	Bodkin Island	Eastern Bay	
Queen Anne's County	Carpenter Island	Chester River	R
Queen Anne's County	DeCoursey Island	Wye River	R
Queen Anne's County	Herring Island	Eastern Bay	
Queen Anne's County	Hog Island	Prospect Bay	
Queen Anne's County	Johnson Island	Crab Alley Bay	
Queen Anne's County	Kent Island	Chesapeake Bay	
Queen Anne's County	Little Island	Crab Alley Bay	
Queen Anne's County	Long Marsh Island	Eastern Bay	
Queen Anne's County	Parson's Island	Eastern Bay	
Queen Anne's County	Philpots Island	Eastern Bay	
Queen Anne's County	Wye Island	Wye River	R
Somerset County	Big Island	Tangier Sound	
Somerset County	Boat Island	Chesapeake Bay	
Somerset County	Deal Island	Tangier Sound	
Somerset County	Deep Banks Island	Holland Straits	
Somerset County	Eastfield Island	Tangier Sound	
Somerset County	Fishing Island	Manokin River	R
Somerset County	Gab Island	Chesapeake Bay	
Somerset County	Hog Neck Island	Chesapeake Bay	
Somerset County	Holland Island	Chesapeake Bay	
Somerset County	Horse Hammock	Tangier Sound	
Somerset County	House Island	Tangier Sound	
Somerset County	Janes Island	Chesapeake Bay	
Somerset County	Jersey Island	Little Annemessex River	R
Somerset County	Little Deal Island	Tangier Sound	
Somerset County	Little Troy Island	Chesapeake Bay	
Somerset County	Maddox Island	Manokin River	R
Somerset County	Otter Island	Tangier Sound	
Somerset County	Piney Island	Manokin River	R
Somerset County	Pry Island	Holland Straits	
Somerset County	Smith Island	Chesapeake Bay	
Somerset County	Solomons Lump	Kedges Straits	
Somerset County	South Marsh Island	Chesapeake Bay	
Somerset County	St. Pierre Island	Manokin River	R
Somerset County	Swan Island	Chesapeake Bay	
Somerset County	Troy Island	Chesapeake Bay	
Somerset County	Turtle Egg Island	Holland Straits	
Somerset County	Western Islands	Kedges Straits	
St. Mary's County	Blakistone Island	Potomac River	R
St. Mary's County	Bullock Island	Wicomico River	R
St. Mary's County	Heron Island	Potomac River	R
St. Mary's County	Jimmy Island	St. Mary's River	R
St. Mary's County	St. Catherine Island	Potomac River	R
St. Mary's County	St. Clement's Island	Potomac River	R
St. Mary's County	Saint George Island	Potomac River	R
St. Mary's County	St. Margaret Island	Wicomico River	R
St. Mary's County	Tippity Wichity Island (formerly Lynch's Island)	St. Mary's River	R
St. Mary's County	White Point Island	Wicomico River	R
Talbot County	Avalon Island	Harris Creek	R
Talbot County	Bruffs Island	Wye River	R
Talbot County	Coaches Neck Island	Chesapeake Bay	
Talbot County	Goat Island	Chesapeake Bay	
Talbot County	Hambleton Island	Broad Creek	R
Talbot County	Herring Island	Miles River	R
Talbot County	Jefferson Island	Chesapeake Bay	
Talbot County	Nelson Island	Choptank River	R
Talbot County	Poplar Island	Chesapeake Bay	
Talbot County	Royston Island	Choptank River	R
Talbot County	Sharps Island	Chesapeake Bay	
Talbot County	Tilghman Island	Chesapeake Bay	
Washington County	Byrnes Island	Potomac River	R
Washington County	Duck Island	Potomac River	R
Washington County	Knott Island	Potomac River	R
Washington County	Shepherds Island	Potomac River	R
Wicomico County	Round Island	Nanticoke River	R
Worcester County	Assacorkin Island	Chincoteague Bay	
Worcester County	Assateague Island	Atlantic Ocean	
Worcester County	Ayers Island	Trappe Creek	R
Worcester County	Bay Island	Chincoteague Bay	
Worcester County	Beacon Clumps	Chincoteague Bay	
Worcester County	Big Island	Assawoman Bay	
Worcester County	Boar Island	Assawoman Bay	
Worcester County	Brady Island	Assawoman Bay	
Worcester County	Cedar Island	Chincoteague Bay	
Worcester County	Collier Island	Isle of Wight Bay	
Worcester County	Corn Hammock	Assawoman Bay	
Worcester County	Cropper Island	Newport Bay	
Worcester County	Devil Island	Assawoman Bay	
Worcester County	Dog and Bitch Island	Isle of Wight Bay	
Worcester County	Drum Island	Isle of Wight Bay	
Worcester County	Eagle Island	St. Martin River	R
Worcester County	Fenwick Island	Atlantic Ocean	
Worcester County	Gambage Island	Turville Creek	R
Worcester County	Grassy Island	Isle of Wight Bay	
Worcester County	Great Egging Island	Chincoteague Bay	
Worcester County	Hen and Chickens Island	St. Martin River	R
Worcester County	Hills Island	Assawoman Bay	
Worcester County	Hog Island	Johnson Bay	
Worcester County	Horn Island	Isle of Wight Bay	
Worcester County	Horse Island	Assawoman Bay	
Worcester County	Isle of Wight	Intracoastal Waterway	
Worcester County	Johns Hammock	Assawoman Bay	
Worcester County	Little Egging Island	Chincoteague Bay	
Worcester County	Lumber Island	Chincoteague Bay	
Worcester County	Mallard Island	Isle of Wight Bay	
Worcester County	Margots Island	St. Martin River	R
Worcester County	Mills Island	Chincoteague Bay	
Worcester County	Oak Island	Assawoman Bay	
Worcester County	Outward Trump	Chincoteague Bay	
Worcester County	Piney Island	Assawoman Bay	
Worcester County	Piney Island	Grey Creek	R
Worcester County	Piney Island	St. Martin River	R
Worcester County	Pope Island	Chincoteague Bay	
Worcester County	Rattlesnake Island	Martin Bay	
Worcester County	Reedy Island	Assawoman Bay	
Worcester County	Reedy Island	Isle of Wight Bay	
Worcester County	Rich Island	Assawoman Bay	
Worcester County	Robins Marsh	Chincoteague Bay	
Worcester County	Sandy Point Island	Sinepuxent Bay	
Worcester County	Shelldrake Island	Brockanorton Bay	
Worcester County	South Hammocks Island	Assawoman Bay	
Worcester County	St. George Island		?
Worcester County	Steves Island	Wicomico River	R
Worcester County	Tingles Island	Chincoteague Bay	
Worcester County	Tizzard Island	Johnson Bay	
Worcester County	Tulls Island	Assawoman Bay	
Worcester County	Twin Islands	Chincoteague Bay	

== See also ==
- List of islands on the Potomac River

== Sources ==
- Maryland State Archives
