= Heron (disambiguation) =

Heron is a family of wading birds.

Heron may also refer to:

== Business ==
- Heron International, a United Kingdom-based property development company
  - Heron Tower, a skyscraper in London
- Heron Foods, a frozen food retail chain in the United Kingdom
- Heron Plastics, a kit car manufacturer in the 1950s and 1960s

== People ==
- Heron or Hero of Alexandria (c. 10 – 70), ancient Greek mathematician and engineer, creator of Heron's formula (area of triangle) and Heron's method (square root)
- Saint Heron (107–127), third Bishop of Antioch
- Heron (martyr) (died 202), Egyptian martyr
- Heron Ricardo Ferreira (born 1958), a Brazilian professional football manager
- Heron (surname)
- Clan Heron, a Scottish border-riding clan
- Heron Baronets, two extinct baronetcies
- Heron (footballer), Heron Crespo da Silva, Brazilian footballer
- Mike "Heron" Herard, hip hop producer

== Places ==
- Heron, Montana
- Héron, Belgium
- Heron Island (disambiguation), various islands
- Heron Lake (disambiguation), several lakes and a small city
- Heron Park, Ottawa, Canada
- Heron Road (Ottawa)
- Heron (crater), an impact crater on the Moon

== Vehicles ==
- HMS Heron, various ships and installations of the Royal Navy
- USS Heron, three ships of the US Navy
- Heron (dinghy)
- Hawker Heron, a biplane fighter
- de Havilland Heron, a four-engine aircraft
- IAI Heron, an Unmanned Aerial Vehicle
- Heron TP, an alternative name for the Eitan (UCAV) unmanned aircraft
- Heron, a Carmarthen and Cardigan Railway steam locomotive built in 1861
- Heron Cars, a New Zealand car maker
- Heron (automobile), a Formula Junior racing car
- Heron (armored personnel carrier), a Polish APC

== Other uses ==
- Heron (band), a 1970s English folk-rock band
- "Heron", a song by Avail from their 2000 album One Wrench
- Hardy Heron, the codename for the 8.04 LTS release of Ubuntu
- Heron Stakes, a thoroughbred race in Great Britain
- Heron's fountain, a hydraulic machine invented by physicist Heron aka "Hero of Alexandria"
- Heron's formula, gives the area of a triangle when the length of all three sides are known.
- Heronian triangle, a triangle with integer side-lengths and integer area.
- Nickname for Inter Miami CF.

== See also ==
- Heroin, an opiate typically used as a recreational drug
