= Carpenter Island (disambiguation) =

Carpenter Island may refer to Carpenter Island, a man-made island and boat launch area on the Columbia River in the U.S. state of Washington

It may also refer to

- Carpenter Island (Antarctica), an island in Peacock Sound, Antarctica
- Carpenter Island (Maryland), an island in Queen Anne's County, Maryland
- Carpenters Island (St. Mary's County, Maryland), a former island in of Chesapeake Bay
