= Aberdeen Proving Ground =

U.S. Army facility located adjacent to Aberdeen, Maryland

- Aberdeen, Maryland
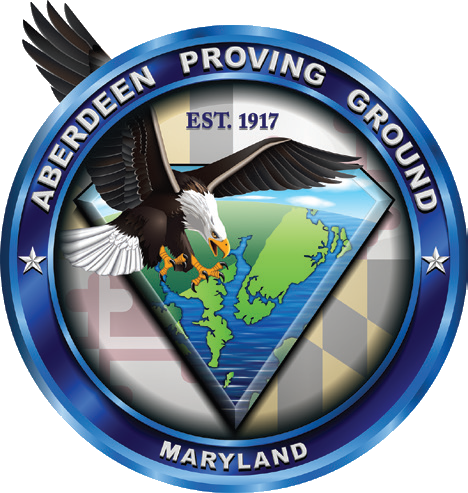
- APG emblem

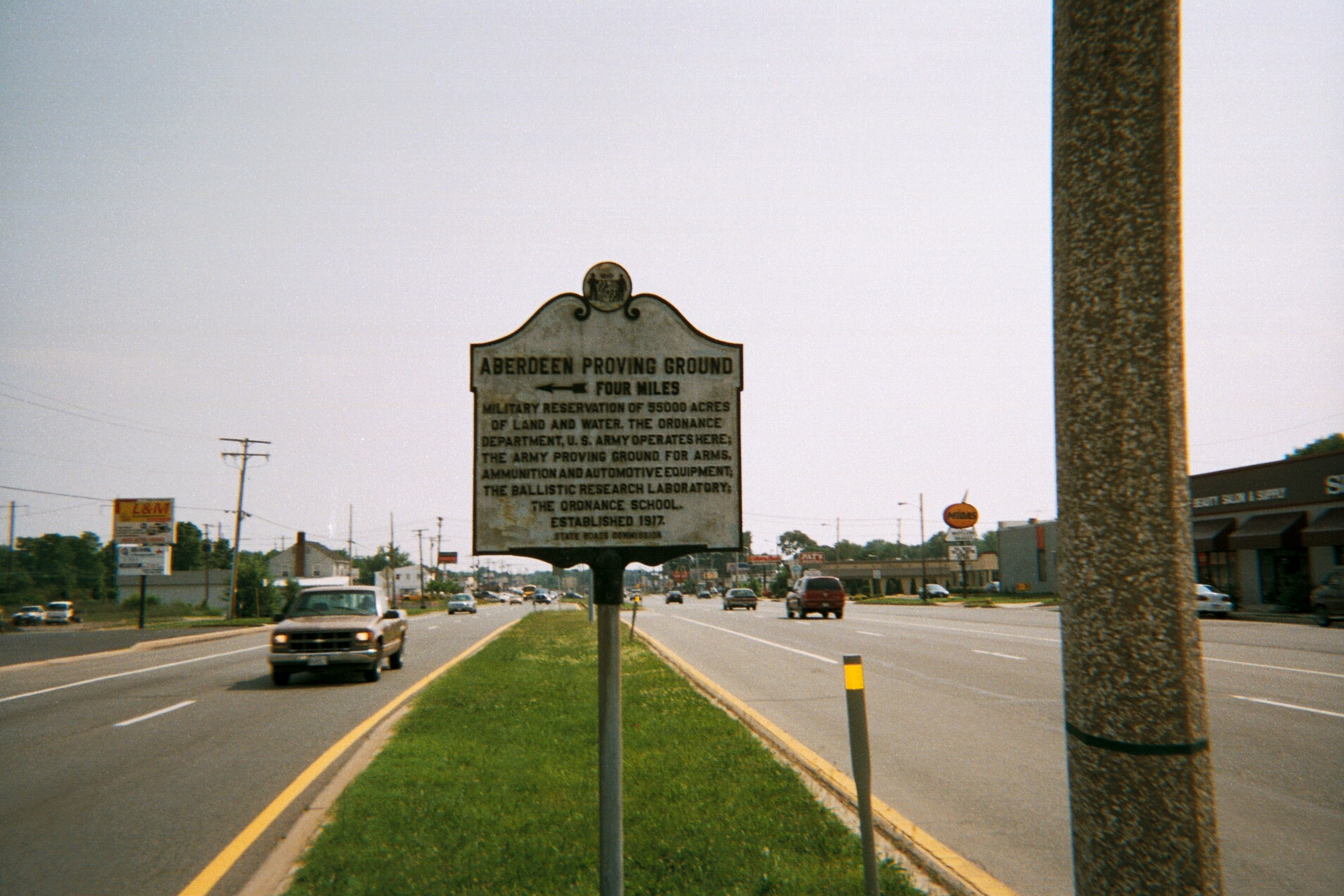
- A sign on U.S. Route 40 in Aberdeen, Maryland commemorating the establishment of Aberdeen Proving Ground in 1917.

Site information
- Owner: United States Army
- Open to the public: No
- Website: APG Garrison link army.mil link

Location
- Location of Aberdeen Proving Ground Aberdeen Proving Ground (the United States)
- Coordinates: 39°28′30″N 76°07′30″W

Site history
- Built: 1917; 109 years ago
- In use: 1917–present

Garrison information
- Current commander: MG James D. Turinetti IV (Senior Commander); COL Troy S. Johnson (Garrison Commander)

Aberdeen Proving Ground (APG) is a United States Army facility that neighbors Aberdeen and Edgewood, Maryland.

Aberdeen Proving Ground was formed in 1917 to provide the Army with sufficient land for testing its munitions and equipment. Around the same time, the Edgewood Arsenal was established on separate land, and provided the production and testing of chemical weapons. Edgewood Arsenal was discontinued as a separate installation in 1971 and its resources were transferred to Aberdeen Proving Ground.

The "Aberdeen area" refers to the northeastern side of APG, while the "Edgewood area" refers to the southwestern side, formerly the Edgewood Arsenal.

A portion of Edgewood Arsenal was separated into Fort Hoyle in 1922, to house artillery units of the Army. The post was incorporated back into Edgewood Arsenal in 1940.

== History ==
Aberdeen Proving Ground is the U.S. Army's oldest active proving ground, established on October 20, 1917—six months after the U.S. entered World War I. The planning and construction were overseen by Brigadier General Colden Ruggles, who later served as the Army's Chief of Ordnance. Its location allowed for design and testing of ordnance materiel to take place near contemporary industrial and shipping centers. The proving ground was created as a successor to the Sandy Hook Proving Ground, which was too small for some of the larger weapons being tested.

At the peak of World War II, the Aberdeen Proving Ground had billeting space for 24,189 enlisted personnel and 2,348 officers.

A notable scientist was James B. Conant, who helped develop Lewisite at Aberdeen, went on to become the President of Harvard, and oversaw the Manhattan Project for the Office of Scientific Research and Development (OSRD).

=== Prompt critical excursion ===
Aberdeen was home to the Army Pulse Radiation Facility Reactor. On September 6, 1968, this reactor was the site of a prompt critical excursion during commissioning tests. This accident harmed no personnel but did release enough heat to reach the melting point of the fuel in the core, at 1150 °C (2100 °F). This caused damage to the fuel components of the reactor, fusing the four central rings together. This is one of thirty-three prompt critical accidents worldwide, between 1949 and 2000.

=== Base Realignment and Closure program ===
Under the Base Realignment and Closure (BRAC) program, as announced in 2005, the APG was projected to lose the Ordnance School and associated R&D facilities, with 3,862 military and 290 civilian jobs moving to Fort Lee, Virginia. APG would gain 451 military and 5,661 civilian jobs from Fort Monmouth, New Jersey. As a result, APG incurred a net-loss of 3,411 military jobs and gain of 5,371 civilian jobs.

The U.S. Army Ordnance Corps Museum was previously located at APG, then moved to Fort Lee, Virginia, as a result of the 2005 Base Realignment and Closure (BRAC) Act.

== Edgewood Arsenal ==
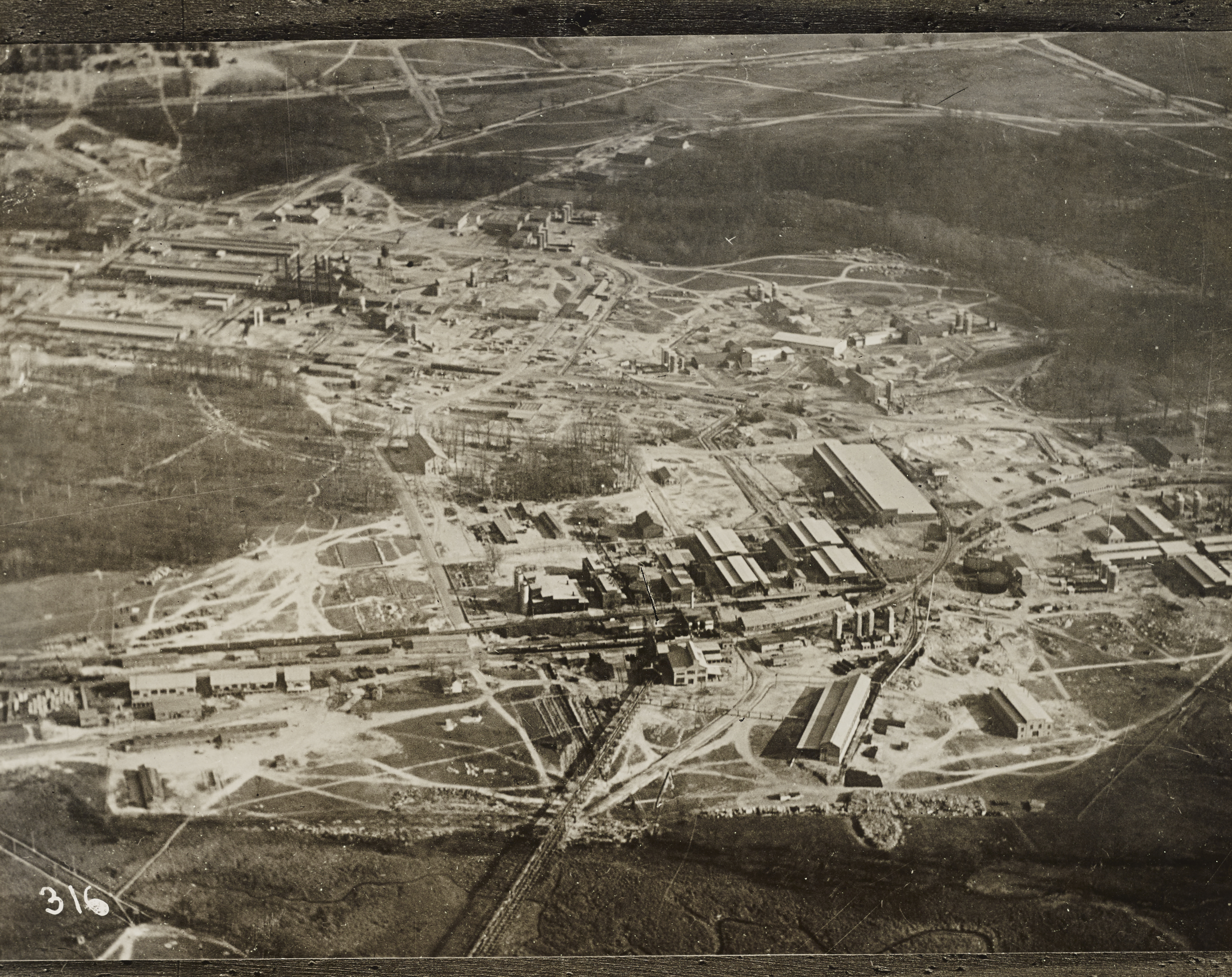
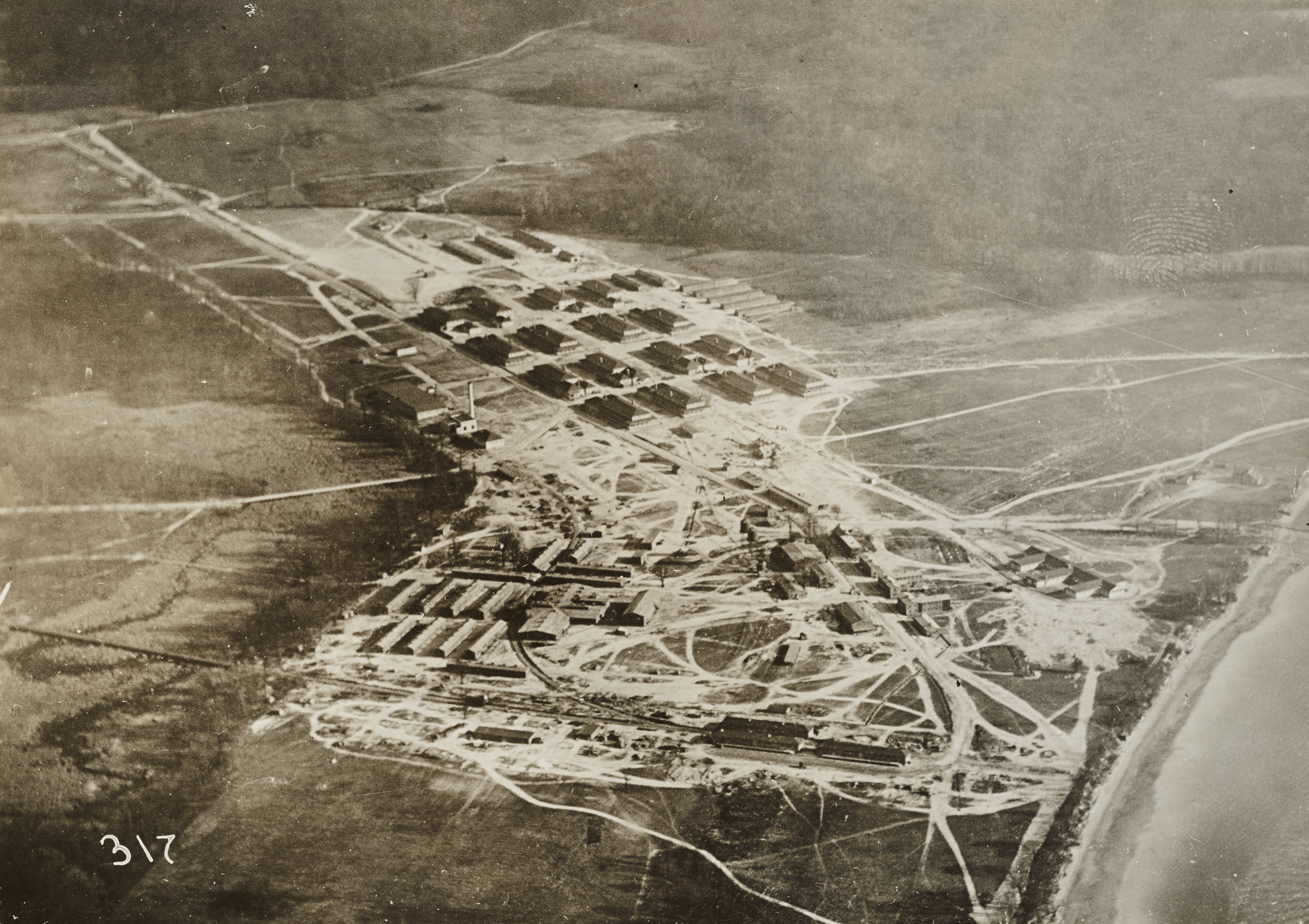
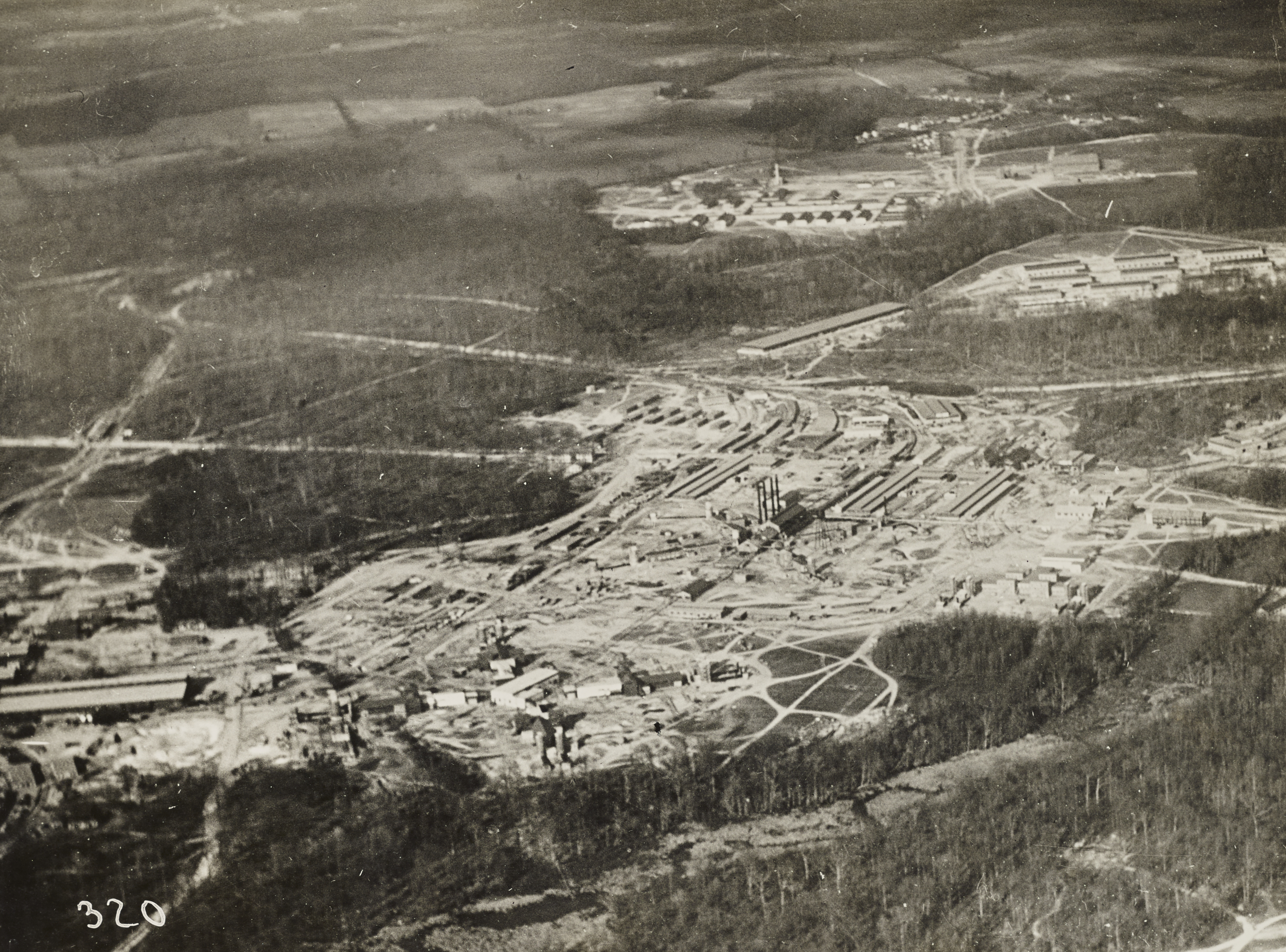
Edgewood Arsenal under construction, 1917

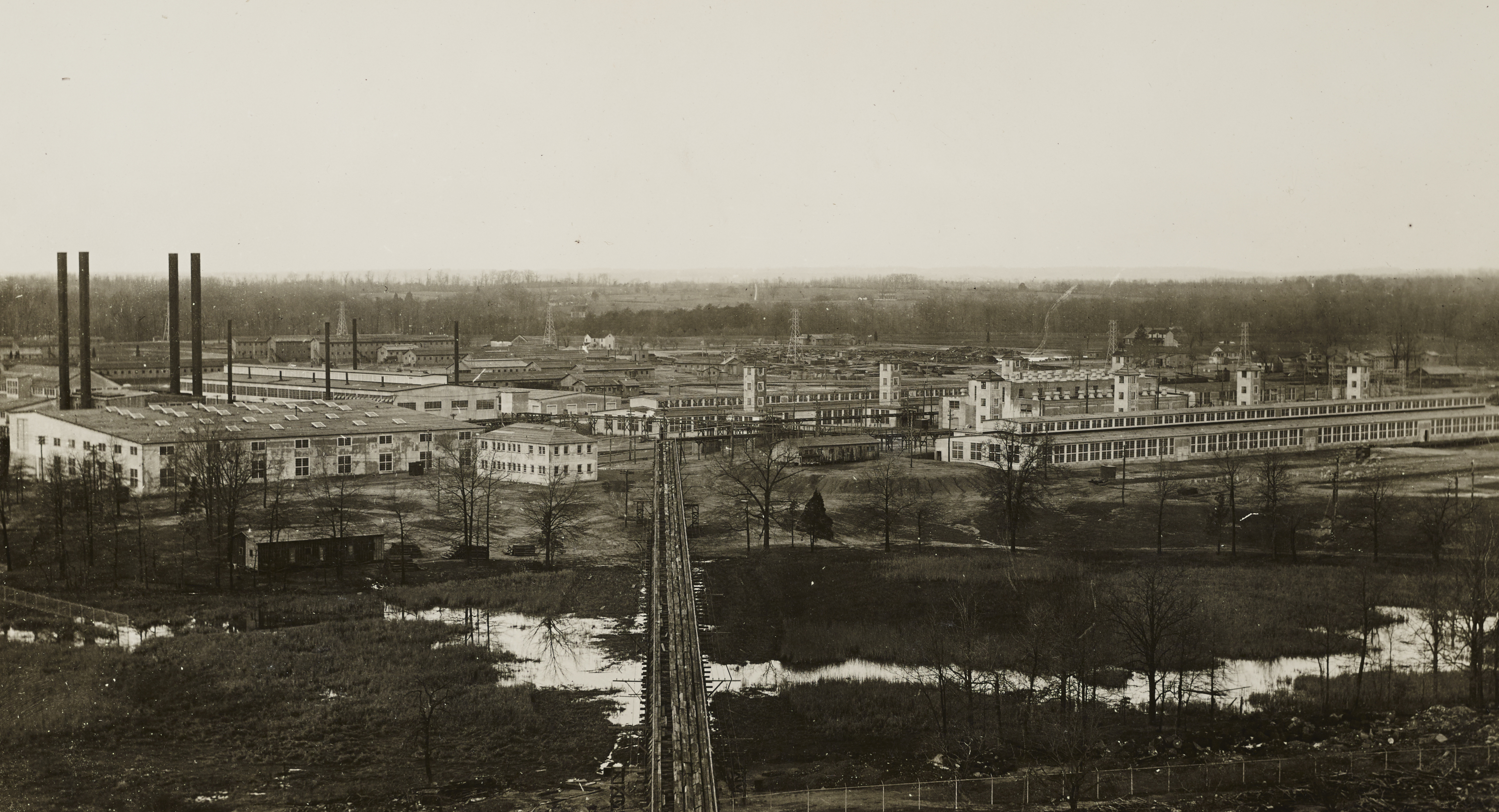
View of chemical plants, 1918

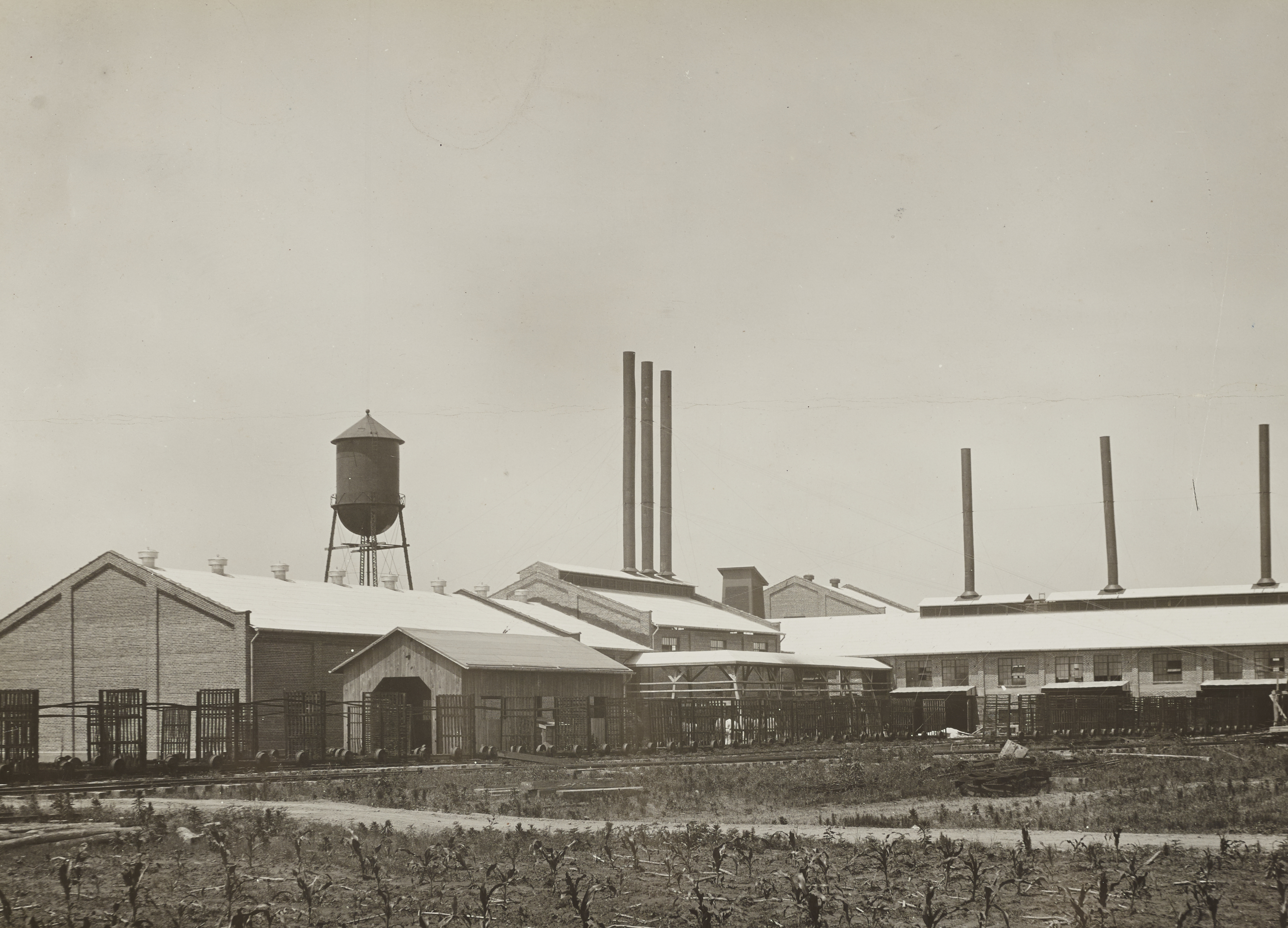
Chemical plant at Edgewood Arsenal, 1917

Although mostly civilian contractors produced conventional munitions during World War I, the United States government built federally owned plants on Aberdeen Proving Ground to manufacture toxic gas. These poison gas manufacturing facilities came to be known as Edgewood Arsenal, officially designated on May 4, 1918.

Edgewood Arsenal included plants to manufacture mustard gas, chloropicrin and phosgene, and separate facilities to fill artillery shells with these chemicals. Production began in 1918, would reach 2,756 short tons (2,500 t) per month, and totaled 10,817 short tons (9,813 t) of toxic gas manufactured at Edgewood Arsenal before the November 1918 armistice. Some of this gas was shipped overseas for use in French and British artillery shells.

The Edgewood area of Aberdeen Proving Ground is approximately 13,000 acres (5,300 ha) or 20.31 square miles (52.6 km^{2}). The Edgewood area was used for the development and testing of chemical agent munitions. From 1917 to the present, the Edgewood area conducted chemical research programs, manufactured chemical agents, and tested, stored, and disposed of toxic materials.

On July 1, 1971, the Edgewood Arsenal was discontinued as a separate installation, and its personnel, resources, and facilities transferred to Aberdeen Proving Ground. The merger intended to reduce operating costs of the installations. The land from Edgewood Arsenal is known today as the Edgewood area.

The Gunpowder Meetinghouse and Presbury Meetinghouse located within the grounds of Edgewood Arsenal are listed on the National Register of Historic Places.

=== Human experiments ===
From 1955 to 1975, the U.S. Army Chemical Corps conducted classified medical studies at Edgewood Arsenal, Maryland, intending to evaluate the impact of low-dose chemical warfare agents on military personnel, and test protective clothing and pharmaceuticals. About 7,000 soldiers took part in these experiments, involving exposures to more than 250 different chemicals, according to the U.S. Department of Defense (DoD). At the time, some volunteers exhibited symptoms of chemical agent exposure, but long-term follow-up was not planned as part of the DoD studies.

The agents tested included chemical warfare agents and other related agents:

- Anticholinesterase nerve agents (Agent VX, sarin, and common organophosphorus (OP) and carbamate pesticides)
- Mustard agent
- Nerve agent antidotes atropine and scopolamine
- Nerve agent reactivators (e.g., the common OP antidote 2-PAM chloride)
- Psychoactive agents (LSD, PCP, cannabinoids, and Agent BZ)
- Irritants and riot control agents
- Alcohol and caffeine

During the week of July 14, 1969, personnel from Naval Applied Science Laboratory in conjunction with personnel from Limited War Laboratory conducted a defoliation test along the shoreline of Poole's Island, Aberdeen Proving Ground using Agent Orange and Agent Orange Plus foam.

=== Fort Hoyle ===
Fort Hoyle was established on October 7, 1922, and was created from a portion of the Edgewood Arsenal. Named for Brigadier General Eli D. Hoyle, former commander of the 6th Field Artillery Regiment, the post was home to the following units: Headquarters, 1st Field Artillery Brigade (1922 to 1939), the 6th Field Artillery Regiment (1922 to 1940), the 1st Ammunition Train (1922 to 1930), and the 99th Field Artillery Regiment (minus 2nd Battalion) (1940 to 1941).

Fort Hoyle was officially disestablished as a separate military post when it was reabsorbed by Edgewood Arsenal on September 10, 1940.

== Other locations of Aberdeen Proving Ground ==
Other parts of APG not attached to the main installation include: the Churchville Test Area in Harford County, and the Carroll Island and Graces Quarters in Baltimore County, Maryland.

=== Churchville Test Area ===
The Churchville Test Area is a test track with hills that provide steep natural grades and tight turns to stress engines, drivetrains, and suspensions for army vehicles, including M1 Abrams tanks, Bradley Fighting Vehicles, and Humvees.

=== Carroll Island ===
The eastern half of Carroll Island was used as a testing location for open air static testing of chemical weapons since the 1950s. During tests of chemical agents and other compounds at Carroll Island, Maryland, from July 1, 1964, to December 31, 1971, nearly 6.5 short tons (5.9 t) of chemicals were disseminated on the test area including 4,600 pounds (2,100 kg) of irritants, 655 pounds (297 kg) of anticholinesterase compounds such as the nerve gasses Sarin and VX, and 263 pounds (119 kg) of incapacitants such as LSD. Simulant agents, incendiaries, decontaminating compounds, signaling and screening smokes, mustard, and herbicides were also released as well as riot control gasses. The test sites consisted of spray grids, a wind tunnel, test grids, and small buildings.

== Geography ==
Aberdeen Proving Ground occupies a land area of 72,500 acres (equivalent to 113.3 square miles, or 293 square kilometers). Its northernmost point is near the mouth of the Susquehanna River, where the river enters the Chesapeake Bay, while on the south, it is bordered by the Gunpowder River. The installation lies on two peninsulas separated by the Bush River. The northeastern area is known as the Aberdeen Area and the southwestern area is called the Edgewood Area (formerly the Edgewood Arsenal).

According to the U.S. Census Bureau, the CDP has a total area of 12.0 square miles (31.1 km^{2}), of which 11.4 square miles (29.5 km^{2}) is land and 0.6 square miles (1.6 km^{2}) (5.09%) is water.

== Demographics ==
Historical population
Census	Pop.	Note	%±
2000	3,116		—
2010	2,093		−32.8%
2020	1,668		−20.3%
U.S. Decennial Census; 2010 2020

For statistical purposes the base is delineated as a census-designated place (Aberdeen Proving Ground CDP) by the U.S. Census Bureau. As of the 2020 census, the resident population was 1,668.

=== 2020 census ===
Aberdeen Proving Ground CDP, Maryland – Racial and ethnic composition Note: the US Census treats Hispanic/Latino as an ethnic category. This table excludes Latinos from the racial categories and assigns them to a separate category. Hispanics/Latinos may be of any race.
Race / Ethnicity (NH = Non-Hispanic)	Pop 2010	Pop 2020	% 2010	% 2020
White alone (NH)	1,207	695	57.67%	41.67%
Black or African American alone (NH)	424	471	20.26%	28.24%
Native American or Alaska Native alone (NH)	12	5	0.57%	0.30%
Asian alone (NH)	43	81	2.05%	4.86%
Pacific Islander alone (NH)	15	4	0.72%	0.24%
Some Other Race alone (NH)	8	19	0.38%	1.14%
Mixed Race or Multi-Racial (NH)	76	147	3.63%	8.81%
Hispanic or Latino (any race)	308	246	14.72%	14.75%
Total	2,093	1,668	100.00%	100.00%

=== 2000 census ===
As of the census of 2000, there were 3,116 people, 805 households, and 763 families residing in the CDP. The population density was 274.1 inhabitants per square mile (105.8/km^{2}). There were 902 housing units at an average density of 79.3 per square mile (30.6/km^{2}). The racial makeup of the CDP was 50.5% White, 34.6% African American, 0.6% Native American, 3.1% Asian, 1.3% Pacific Islander, 5.7% from other races, and 4.2% from two or more races; 11.2% of the population were Hispanic or Latino of any race.

In the CDP, the population was spread out, with 40.1% under the age of 18, 10.3% from 18 to 24, 44.9% from 25 to 44, 4.4% from 45 to 64, and 0.2% who were 65 years of age or older. The median age was 25 years. For every 100 females, there were 113.9 males. For every 100 females age 18 and over, there were 117.6 males.

The median income for a household in the CDP was $38,875, and the median income for a family was $40,306. Males had a median income of $26,943 versus $26,194 for females. The per capita income for the CDP was $12,808. About 4.2% of families and 5.6% of the population were below the poverty line, including 6.4% of those under age 18 and none of those age 65 or over.

== Storage and demilitarization of chemical weapons ==
The Edgewood Chemical Activity (ECA) was a depot that stored chemical weapons on APG. Elimination of the depot's chemical materials was put on an accelerated schedule following the September 11 attacks. The depot's chemical weapons were destroyed by February 2006.

== Contamination ==
The Edgewood area of the Aberdeen Proving Ground site was proposed to the Environmental Protection Agency's National Priorities List of the most serious uncontrolled or abandoned hazardous waste sites requiring long term remedial action on April 10, 1985. The site was formally added to the National Priorities List on February 21, 1990.

The Edgewood area has large areas of land and water and numerous buildings that are contaminated or suspected of contamination. Virtually all the land areas of the site contain contaminated or potentially contaminated sites and potentially buried ordnance. Substances disposed of in the area include significant quantities of napalm, white phosphorus, and chemical agents. On-site surface waters include rivers, streams, and wetlands.

Edgewood area standby water supply wells in the Canal Creek area previously served approximately 3,000 people. The wells have been abandoned. The Long Bar Harbor well field of the County Department of Public Works and the well field used by the Joppatowne Sanitary Subdistrict serve 35,000 people within 3 miles (4.8 km) of the site. On-site groundwater sampling has identified perchlorate, various metals, volatile organic compounds (VOCs) and chemical warfare agent degradation products. On-site soil contamination sampling has identified various VOCs, metals, and unexploded ordnance in surface and subsurface soil. On-site surface water sampling has identified various metals, pesticides, phosphorus, and VOCs. People who accidentally ingest or come in direct contact with contaminated groundwater, surface water, soil, or sediments may be at risk. The area is a designated habitat for bald eagles.

== Controversies ==
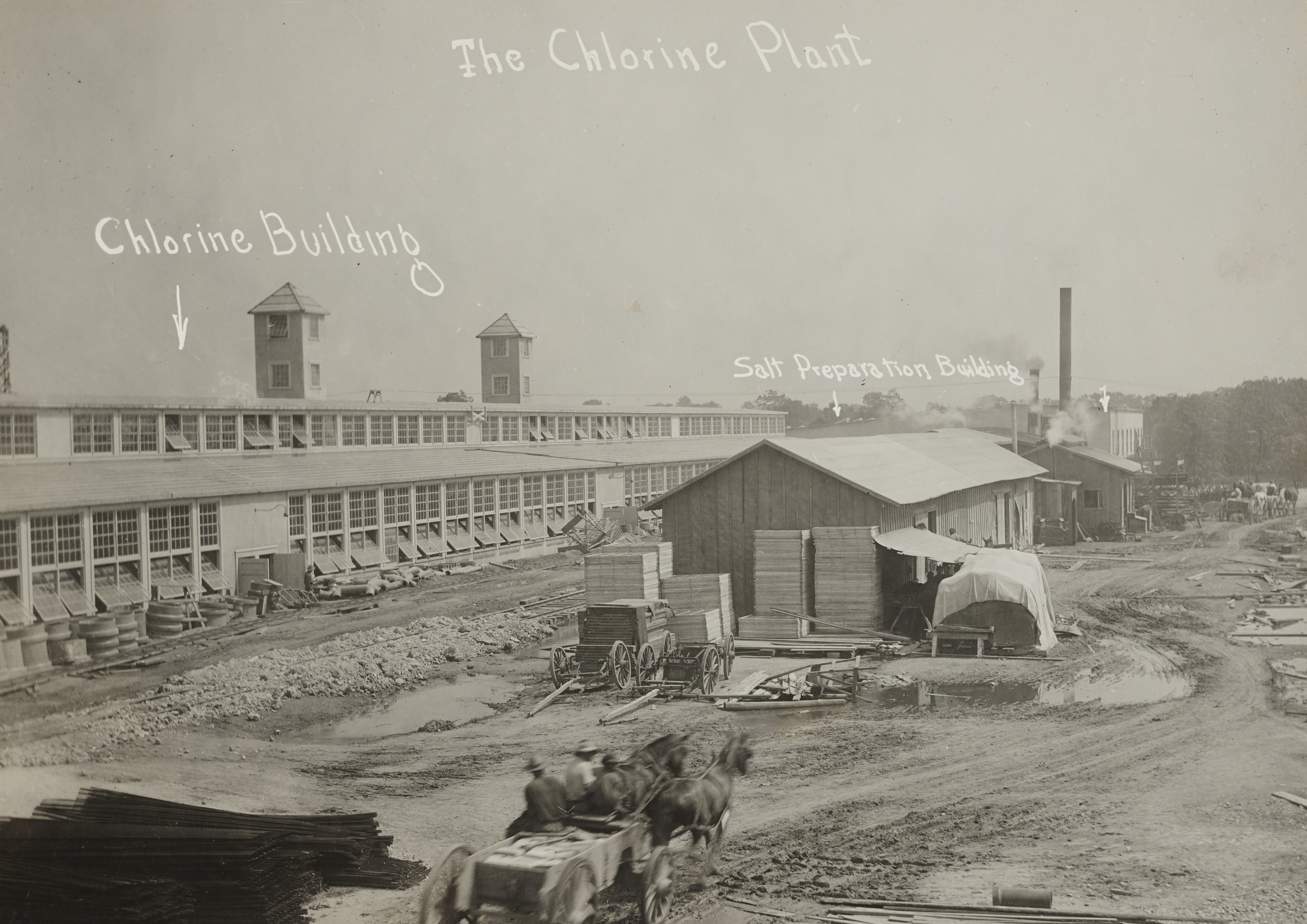
Chlorine plant at the Edgewood Arsenal, 1918

A scandal at the APG surfaced in 1996. The U.S. Army brought charges against twelve commissioned and non-commissioned male officers for sexual assault of female trainees under their command.

Following campaigning by PETA, the Physicians Committee for Responsible Medicine, and other organizations, the U.S. military announced in 2011 it was replacing its use of monkeys in the Army's nerve-agent attack training courses with human simulators and other non-animal teaching methods. The training drills had been carried out on vervet monkeys at Aberdeen Proving Ground.

A Joint Land Attack Cruise Missile Defense Elevated Netted Sensor System (JLENS) broke free from its mooring station at APG on October 28, 2015. It traveled for three hours through the skies, finally crashing in a wooded area in northeastern Pennsylvania.

== Tenant units and activities ==
=== Operational units ===
==== United States Army ====
- 1st Area Medical Laboratory (1st AML)
- 20th CBRNE Command
- 203rd Military Intelligence Battalion

==== Maryland Army National Guard ====
- Army Aviation Support Facility (AASF)
- Aviation Depot Maintenance Roundout Unit (ADMRU)
- 29th Combat Aviation Brigade (29th CAB)

=== Institutional units ===
==== United States Army ====
- U.S. Army Chemical Materials Activity (CMA)
- U.S. Army Combat Capabilities Development Command (DEVCOM)
  - DEVCOM C5ISR Center
  - DEVCOM Chemical Biological Center (CBC)
- U.S. Army Communications-Electronics Command (CECOM)
- U.S. Army Contracting Command-Aberdeen Proving Ground (ACC-APG)
- U.S. Army Medical Research Institute of Chemical Defense (USAMRICD)
- U.S. Army Transformation Decision Analysis Center (TDAC)
- U.S. Army Test and Evaluation Command (ATEC)
  - U.S. Army Aberdeen Test Center (ATC)
  - U.S. Army Joint Test Element (JTE)
- Capability Program Executive, Chemical, Biological, Radiological and Nuclear Defense (CPE CBRND)
- Capability Program Executive, Command and Control Information Network (CPE C2IN)
- Capability Program Executive, Intelligence and Spectrum Warfare (CPE ISW)
- Program Executive Office, Assembled Chemical Weapons Alternatives (PEO ACWA)
- Kirk U.S. Army Health Clinic (named for Maj. Gen. Norman T. Kirk)

==== United States Department of Defense ====
- Defense Commissary Agency, Aberdeen (DECA-APG)
- Defense Logistics Agency Land Aberdeen (DLA)
- Defense Centers for Public Health-Aberdeen (DCPH-A)

== See also ==
- Edgewood Arsenal human experiments
- Aberdeen scandal (1996)

Related locations and organizations

- Ballistic Research Laboratory
- United States Army Research Laboratory
- United States Army Ordnance Training and Heritage Center, a museum relocated from APG to Fort Lee in 2010
- Naval Air Weapons Station China Lake
- Dugway Proving Ground
- Poplar Island (Chesapeake Bay)
- Maryland World War II Army Airfields
- Nevada Test and Training Range
- Semipalatinsk Test Site
