= Maryland Coastal Bays Program =

Environmental organization in Maryland, US

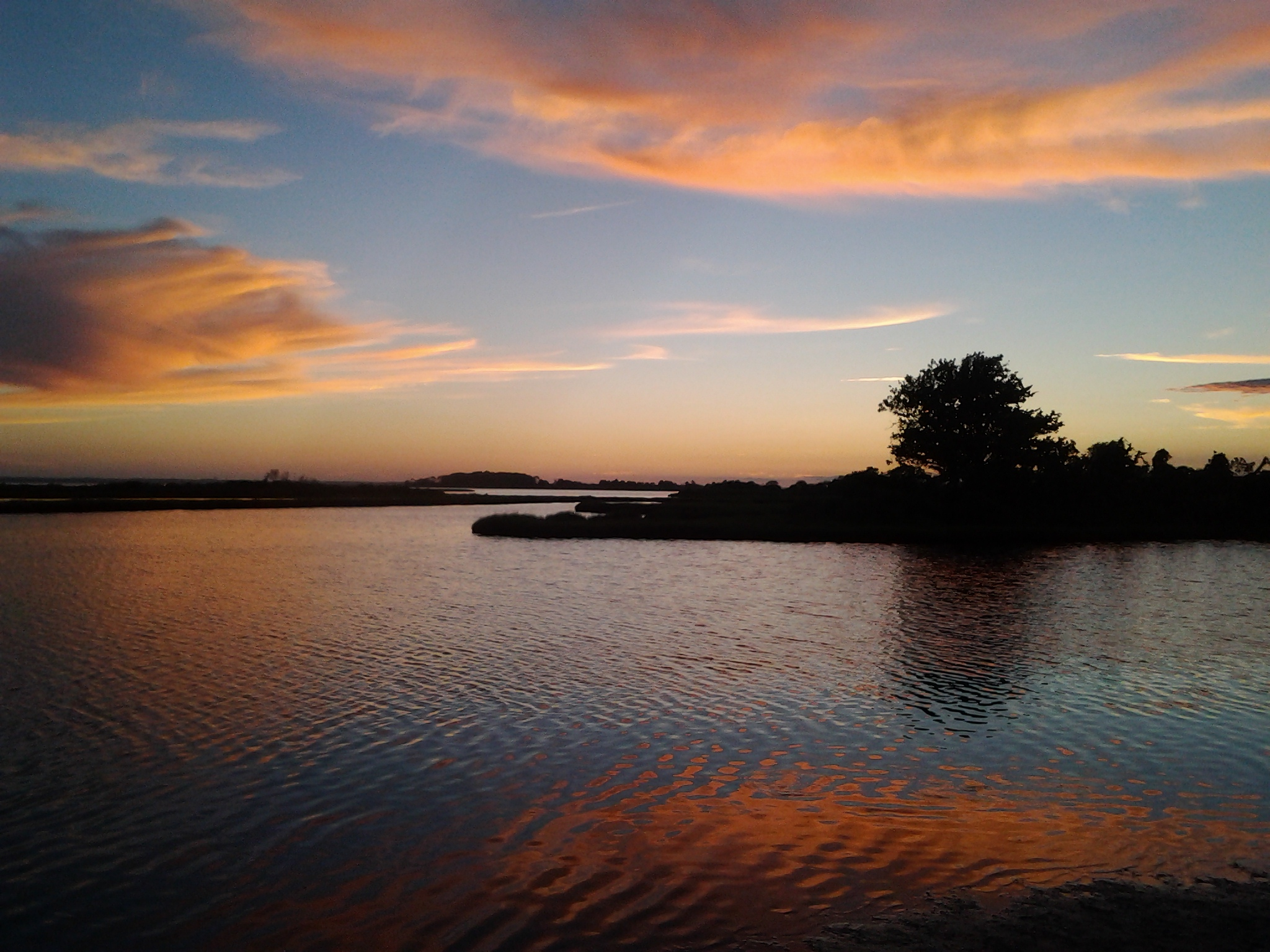
- Chincoteague Bay
- Abbreviation: MCBP
- Founded: 1996
- Headquarters: Berlin, Maryland
- Region served: Maryland Coastal Bays
- Board Chair: Steve Taylor
- Executive Director: Eva DiDonato
- Website: https://mdcoastalbays.org

The Maryland Coastal Bays Program (MCBP) is one of the 28 United States National Estuary Programs created in the 1987 Amendments to the Clean Water Act. The program, organized by the United States Environmental Protection Agency, is a non-regulatory federal-state-local collaboration working to restore water quality and conserve the natural resources of the bay system adjacent to Ocean City, Maryland and Assateague Island. The partnership works with municipalities, non-profits, governmental agencies, and businesses; and helps develop, find funding for, and implement projects and programs aimed at improving the health of the estuary. The partnership either directly implements these projects, or administers and manages grants, holds educational workshops and highlights project results.

The program operates the Maryland Coastal Bays Foundation (IRS EIN 52–2123356), a private, non-profit corporation which develops and implements a Comprehensive Conservation Management Plan for Maryland's Coastal Bays and supports conservation and educational activities.

The bays managed under the program are:

- Assawoman Bay
- Chincoteague Bay
- Isle of Wight Bay
- Newport Bay
- Sinepuxent Bay
- St. Martin River.

== Water quality ==
In 2021 the program reported that overall water quality in the bays declined during 2019–2020, mainly associated with decline in seagrass and hard clams. Nutrient pollution in the bays were at moderate levels, and the program continues to monitor for harmful algal blooms (HABs), which are often caused by excess nutrients.

== Projects ==
The program has conducted environmental monitoring of HABs offshore from the bays, focusing on nutrient pollution and occurrences of Dinophysis, Karenia and Pseudo-nitzschia.

In 2021 the program worked with the Maryland Department of Natural Resources to establish a nesting project for Common terns on an artificial island in Chincoteague Bay.
