= Ragged Island =

Ragged Island may refer to:

== Bahamas ==
- Ragged Island, Bahamas

== Canada ==
- Imiliit formerly Ragged Island, Nunavut, Canada

== United Kingdom ==
- Ragged Island, Isles of Scilly, England

== United States ==
- Ragged Island (Pye Islands), Alaska, United States
- Ragged Island (Harpswell, Maine), United States
- Ragged Island (Massachusetts), United States
- Ragged Island (Maryland), United States
- Ragged Island Wildlife Management Area, Virginia, United States
- Criehaven, Maine, United States, also called Ragged Island

== See also ==
- Rugged Island (South Shetland Islands), Antarctica
- Ragged Isle, an American soap opera web series
