= Gunpowder Meetinghouse =

Historic church in Maryland, US

- U.S. National Register of Historic Places
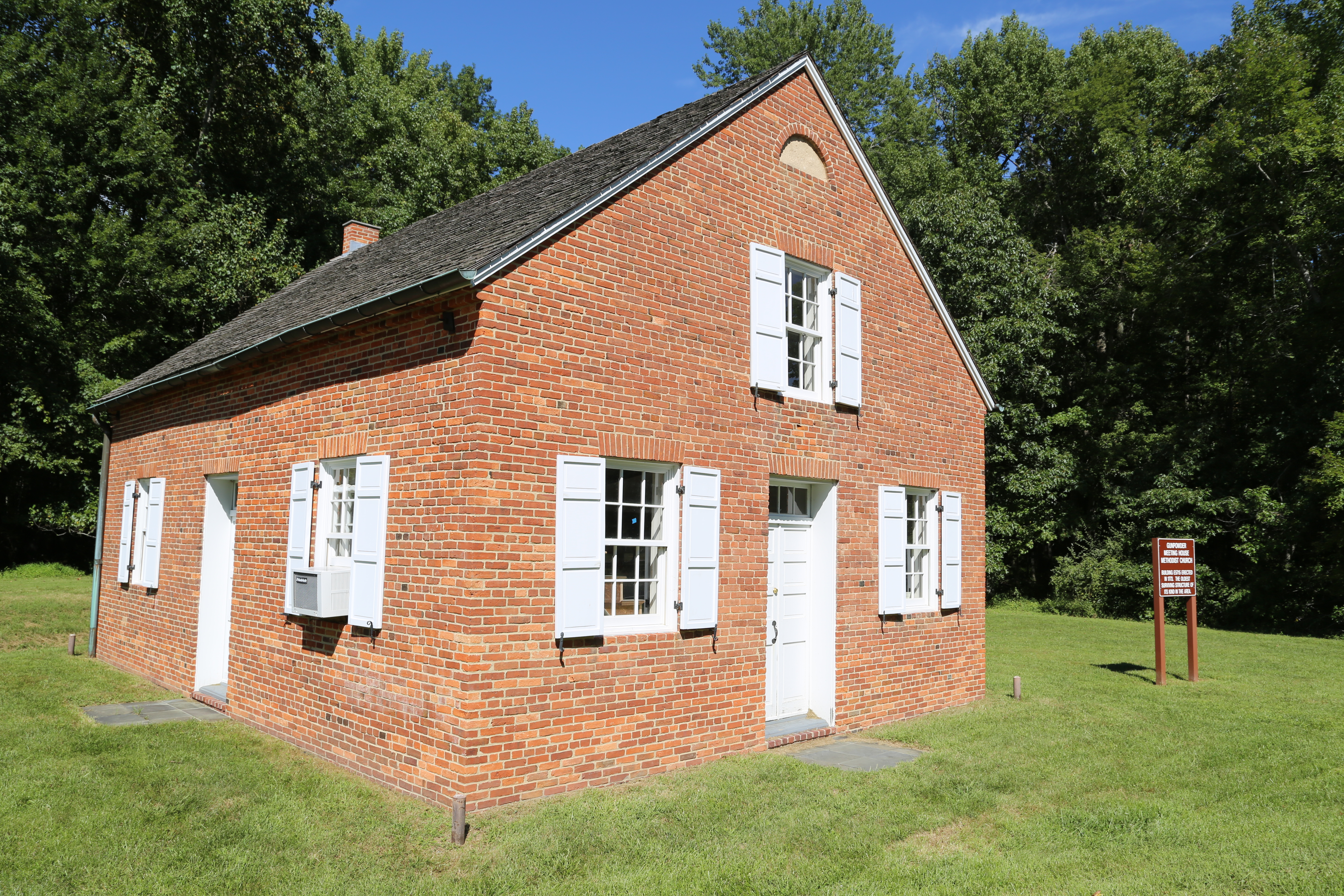
- Gunpowder Meetinghouse in 2014

- Location within Maryland Location within the United States
- Location: Magnolia Rd., Aberdeen Proving Ground, Maryland
- Coordinates: 39°24′13″N 76°18′29″W
- Area: 0.2 acres (0.081 ha)
- NRHP reference No.: 74000954
- Added to NRHP: June 5, 1974

Gunpowder Meetinghouse is a historic Methodist church located at Aberdeen Proving Ground, Harford County, Maryland. It is a one-room brick structure that may date to 1773.

It was listed on the National Register of Historic Places in 1974.
