= Couthuin Airport =

Former airfield in Belgium

- IATA: none; ICAO: ~~EBHE~~

Summary
- Airport type: Public
- Serves: Héron
- Location: Belgium
- Elevation AMSL: 607 ft (185 m)
- Coordinates: 50°32′16″N 005°006′26″E

Map
- Location in Belgium

Runways
Direction	Length		Surface
Direction	m	ft	Surface
~~05/23~~	~~299~~	~~980~~	~~Grass~~
- Source: Landings.com

Couthuin Airport ~~(ICAO: EBHE)~~ was a public use airport located near Héron, Liège, Belgium.

== See also ==
- List of airports in Belgium
