= Heron Island =

Heron Island may refer to:

- Heron Island (Queensland), in Australia
- Heron Island (New Brunswick), in Baie des Chaleurs, Canada
- Heron Island (Quebec), in the Saint Lawrence River, Canada
- Heron Island, Berkshire, on the River Thames, England
- Heron Island, Maryland, on the Potomak River, USA
- Heron Island, County Fermanagh, a townland in County Fermanagh, Northern Ireland
- Heron Island, South Bristol, Maine, shortened from full name: Inner Heron Island
- Heron Island in Kelsey Park, London, England
