= Churchville Test Area =

U.S. Army facility in Maryland

Coordinates: 39.596°N 76.253°W

The Churchville Test Area is a United States Army facility of the Aberdeen Proving Ground, located northeast of Bel Air, Maryland (in Harford County, Maryland, U.S.).

The Churchville Test Area () is a hilly set of cross-country road test tracks providing a variety of steep natural grades and tight turns designed to stress engines, drivetrains and suspension systems for Army vehicles, such as the M1 Abrams tanks, M2 Bradley fighting vehicle and the Humvee.

The Test Area consists of 11 miles (18 km) of interconnected roads and test courses located on 250 acres (1.0 km^{2}), with both 3-and-4-mile (4.8 and 6.4 km) closed loop courses, mud, dust and gravel surfaces, and grades ranging from 7% to 29%.

On March 21, 2007, the Army celebrated the designation of a 163.5-acre (0.662 km^{2}) buffer-zone alongside the Churchville Test Area, in conjunction with the Harford County Government, the Harford Land Trust, and the Hopkins family. Part of the US Army's Compatible Use Buffer program, under the Pentagon's environmental protection initiative, this land-use purchase was $1.4M (US).

== See also ==
- US Army Ordnance Museum
- Aberdeen, Maryland
