= Hart-Miller Island State Park =

State park in Baltimore County, Maryland

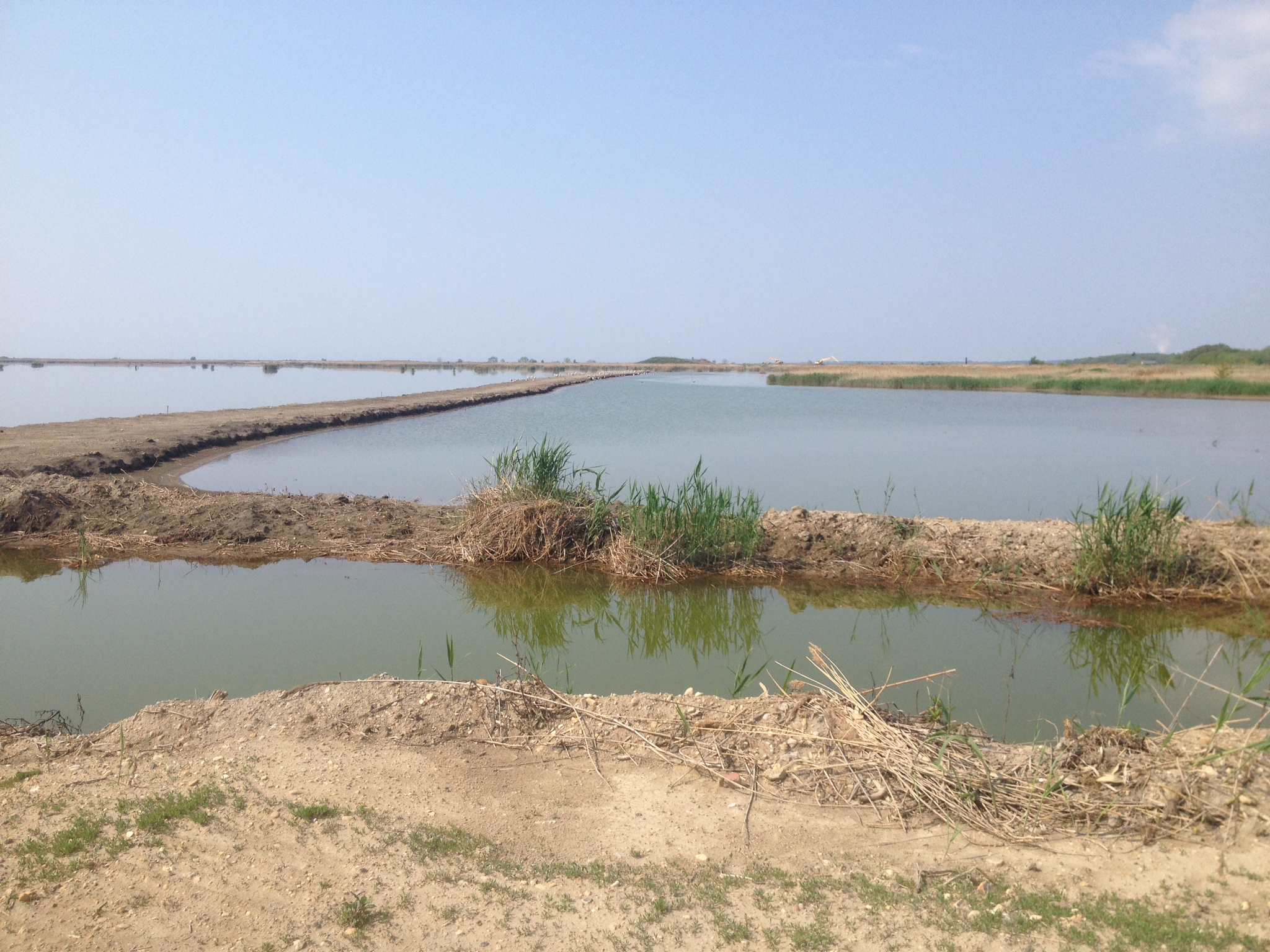

- Location within Maryland Location within the United States
- Location: Baltimore County, Maryland, United States
- Coordinates: 39°15′06″N 76°22′23″W
- Area: 244 acres (99 ha)
- Elevation: 3 ft (0.91 m)
- Established: 1977-78
- Administrator: Maryland Department of Natural Resources
- Designation: Maryland state park
- Website: Official website

Hart-Miller Island State Park is a 244-acre (99 ha) public recreation area located at the mouth of Back River in Essex, Maryland. The state park consists of Hart-Miller Island, a man-made landfill linking two natural Chesapeake Bay islands, Hart and Miller, and also includes Hawk Cove and Pleasure Island. The park is accessible only by boat.

== History ==
The island comprising Hart and Miller with a total land surface of 1,100 acres (450 ha)—was acquired by the state in the late 1970s. A dike was built joining Hart and Miller islands into Hart Miller Island in 1983, and the subsequent containment area was filled with dredge material from Baltimore harbor and the Patapsco River over the next 20 years.

== Activities and amenities ==
The park features a 3,000-foot (910 m) sandy beach, hiking trails, an observation tower, picnicking facilities, and sites for overnight camping. The north cell of the island's 1,100-acre surface area is closed; the south cell officially opened for public access in May 2016.
