= Blackwater River (Maryland) =

Location
- Country: United States
- State: Maryland
- Region: Dorchester County

Physical characteristics
- Source
  - coordinates: 38°27′26″N 76°14′08″W
- Mouth: Fishing Bay
  - coordinates: 38°21′36″N 76°00′27″W
  - elevation: 0 ft (0 m)

Basin features
- Tributaries
  - left: Little Blackwater River

The Blackwater River is a 25.8-mile-long (41.5 km) saltwater river in Dorchester County, Maryland. It has many twists and bends and flows through Blackwater National Wildlife Refuge. It runs through Robbins, where there is a boat ramp called Shorter's Wharf and a bridge.

The river does not rise anywhere because the water is sea level from its mouth at Fishing Bay to its landward end at a large unnamed swamp in the Blackwater Refuge. The river can have freshwater species in spring and summer like catfish or bass. The river also has saltwater perch and other saltwater fish that prefer upper parts of rivers. In the winter the river is used for waterfowl hunting.
