= National Estuary Program =

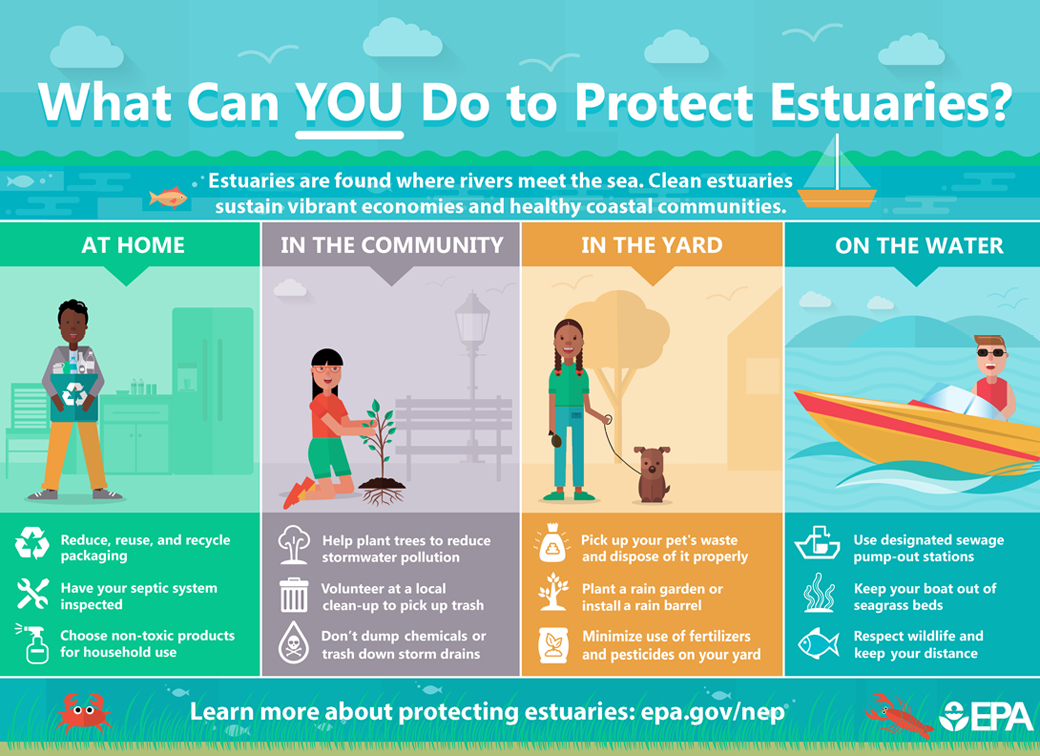
EPA infographic about protecting estuaries

In the United States, the National Estuary Program (NEP) provides grants to states where governors have identified nationally significant estuaries that are threatened by pollution, land development, or overuse. Governors have identified a total of 28 estuaries, and the Environmental Protection Agency (EPA) awards grants to these states to develop comprehensive management plans to restore and protect the estuaries. Congress created the NEP in the 1987 amendments to the Clean Water Act.

== Program organization ==
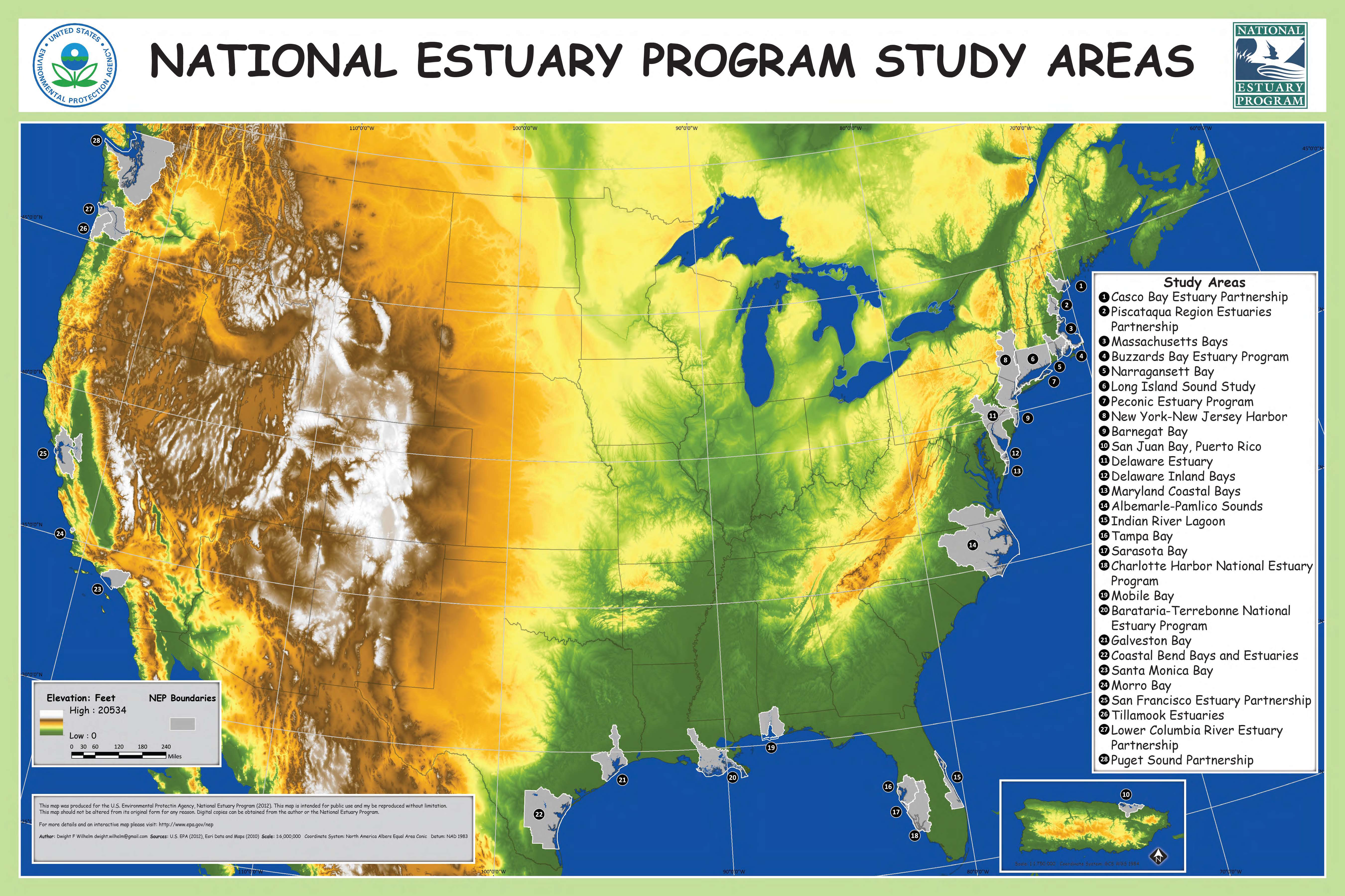
Map of 28 local estuary programs

The National Estuary Program is made up of 28 smaller organizations set up regionally by estuary. Each of the estuary organizations is managed by local community leaders and staff. Participating organizations may include universities, local non-profit organizations, and state and local government agencies. It is the job of the NEP to help communities better protect, restore and maintain their estuaries. Unlike traditional environmental governance approaches, the NEP targets a broader range of issues and participates more effectively in local communities.

Before establishment of the national program, some small local grassroots organizations pursued environmental improvement efforts in various regions of the country, with limited effect. The programs now focus not just on improving water quality in an estuary, but on maintaining the integrity of the system as a whole. If all parts of the estuary are not addressed it will be unable to balance the changes and may ecologically collapse, doing more harm than good. That includes chemical, physical, and biological properties, as well as its economic, recreational, and aesthetic public values. This allows communities that live in watersheds to have local as well as national protection.

EPA provides annual funding and technical assistance to the local estuary programs.

== Common challenges addressed by local programs ==
Each of the participating coastal areas has suffered varying degrees of impacts with regard to water quality and habitat decline. Many of the local estuary programs have initiated projects in one or more of the following problem categories.

- Alteration of environmental flows, which may include hydromodification
- Climate change
- Declines in fish and wildlife populations
- Habitat loss
- Invasive species
- Pollutants:
  - Nutrients (nitrogen and phosphorus compounds)
  - Pathogens
  - Urban runoff
  - Toxics.

== Local programs ==
- Albemarle - Pamlico National Estuary Program, Virginia/North Carolina
- Barataria-Terrebonne National Estuary Program, Louisiana
- Barnegat Bay Partnership, New Jersey
- Buzzards Bay National Estuary Program, Massachusetts
- Casco Bay Estuary Partnership, Maine
- Charlotte Harbor National Estuary Program, Florida
- Coastal Bend Bays and Estuaries Program, Texas
- Delaware Center for the Inland Bays, Delaware
- Galveston Bay Estuary Program, Texas
- Indian River Lagoon National Estuary Program, Florida
- Long Island Sound Study, New York
- Lower Columbia Estuary Partnership, Oregon/Washington
- Maryland Coastal Bays Program, Maryland
- Massachusetts Bays National Estuary Program, Massachusetts
- Mobile Bay National Estuary Program, Alabama
- Morro Bay National Estuary Program, California
- Narragansett Bay Estuary Program, Rhode Island
- New York-New Jersey Harbor Estuary Program, New York
- Partnership for the Delaware Estuary, Delaware
- Peconic Estuary Program, New York
- Piscataqua Region Estuaries Partnership, Maine/New Hampshire
- Puget Sound Partnership, Washington
- San Francisco Estuary Partnership, California
- San Juan Bay Estuary Partnership, Puerto Rico
- Santa Monica Bay Restoration Foundation (now Bay Foundation), California
- Sarasota Bay Estuary Program, Florida
- Tampa Bay Estuary Program, Florida
- Tillamook Estuaries Partnership, Oregon

== Transparency concerns ==
In 2016 a Los Angeles County Superior Court judge found that the Santa Monica Bay Restoration Commission violated the California Public Records Act by failing to disclose records about a wetlands restoration project.

== See also ==
- National Estuarine Research Reserve
