= Little Blackwater River (Maryland) =

Location
- Country: United States
- State: Maryland
- Region: Dorchester County

Physical characteristics
- Source
  - coordinates: 38°32′26″N 76°02′08″W
- Mouth: Blackwater River
  - coordinates: 38°25′15″N 76°05′49″W
- Length: 15 mi (24 km)

The Little Blackwater River is a tributary of the Blackwater River located in Dorchester County, Maryland.

The relatively shallow river is about 15 miles (24 km) long and is surrounded by farms. It is located between Maple Dam Road to the east and Egypt Road to the west. The river begins behind Cambridge-South Dorchester High School in Cambridge, where its water level is nearly 20 feet (6.1 m) above sea level, and it ends below Bucktown.
