= Carpenter Island (Maryland) =

Coordinates: 39°01′13″N 76°10′16″W

Carpenter Island (historical) is located on the southern end of the Chester River on Chesapeake Bay in Queen Anne's County, Maryland. It has been known as Carpenter Island or Carpenter's Island since the early 18th century.

This small natural island once contained a fishing camp and a small house. The house was made from logs that had been washed ashore. Over time, the wakes of passing water craft and ships eroded the island into nothing more than a mud flat at low tide. It is still listed as an Island on USGS maps. It is also still listed as an Island of Maryland.

A Carpenters Island in St. Mary's County, Maryland, was included in a list of "lost islands" of the Chesapeake Bay published in 2005.
