= Capability Program Executive for Chemical, Biological, Radiological, and Nuclear Defense =

The Capability Program Executive for Chemical, Biological, Radiological and Nuclear Defense (CPE CBRND) (formerly Joint Program Executive Office for Chemical, Biological, Radiological and Nuclear Defense (JPEO-CBRND)) is a sub-office of the United States Assistant Secretary of the Army for Acquisition, Logistics, and Technology (ASA(ALT)).

The CPE CBRND is the Joint Services' lead for development, acquisition, fielding, and life-cycle support of chemical, biological, radiological, and nuclear defense equipment and medical countermeasures.

Other components of the CPE CBRND are the Joint Project Management for Chemical, Biological, Radiological, and Nuclear Medical (JPM CBRN Medical), and the Joint Project Lead for Chemical, Biological, Radiological, and Nuclear Defense Enabling Biotechnologies.

The CPE CBRND is part of the Biosurveillance Ecosystem (BSVE) program of the Department of Defense (DoD) Defense Threat Reducation Agency's (DTRA) Joint Science and Technology Office for Chemical and Biological Defense (JSTO-CBD), together with Homeland Security's National Biosurveillance Integration Center.
