= Poplar Island (Chesapeake Bay) =

Island in Chesapeake Bay, United States

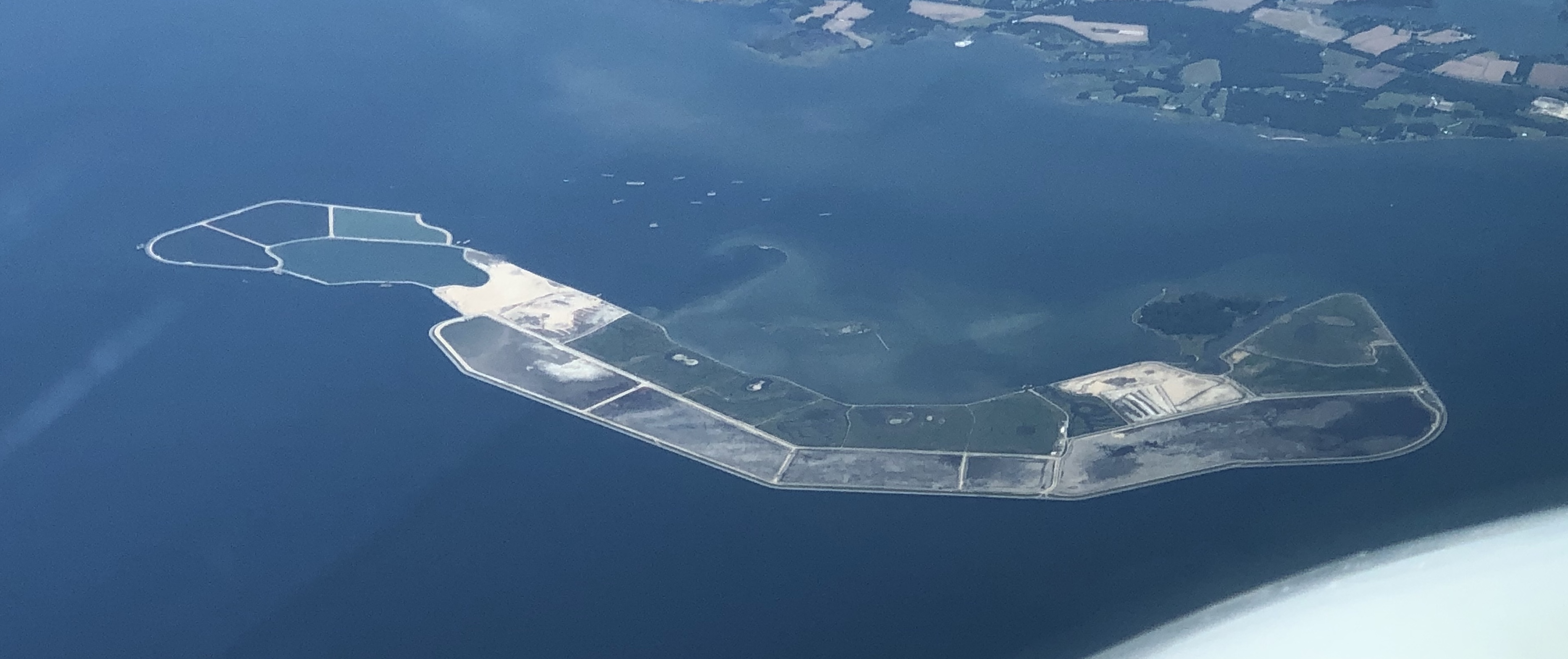
- Poplar Island in June 2019, facing east
- Interactive map of Poplar Island

Geography
- Location: Chesapeake Bay
- Coordinates: 38°46′01″N 76°22′54″W
- Length: 4.82 km (2.995 mi)
- Width: 0.85 km (0.528 mi)

Administration
- United States
- State: Maryland

Demographics
- Population: 0 (2020)

Poplar Island is a 3-mile-long (4.8-kilometer-long) island located on the Chesapeake Bay, part of Talbot County, Maryland. In the late 1800s it had a population of 100 living in the town of Valliant but it was abandoned by the 1920s due to erosion of the island. By the 1990s its land mass had dwindled down to a few acres. In 2001, a project led by the U.S. Army Corps of Engineers to restore the island began using dredged material from the Chesapeake Bay's approach channels to Baltimore, located approximately 30 miles north/north-west of the island.

== History ==
The island was first encountered by Europeans in 1573 by Spanish explorer Juan Menendez de Marques. English colonists began settling Poplar Island in the 1630s. Poplar Island served as a campsite for British warships during the War of 1812.

Poplar Island had split into three pieces by the late 1800s. At that time, the larger piece was home to the town of Valliant, a community of about 100 residents, with its own post office, school, general store, and a sawmill. Poplar Island's sawmill may have contributed to the island's erosion by cutting down trees, whose roots held the sandy soil together.

When surveyed in 1847, Poplar Island was 1,140 acres (4,600,000 m^{2}), shaped in a 4-mile-long (6.4 km) crescent, bending around Jefferson Island (east).

In the relatively calm years between 1880 and 1920, about 15 families enjoyed community life on the island, which boasted productive farmlands, tobacco barns, a sawmill, schoolhouse, post office, and general store. By 1929, however, the island had been taken over by moonshiners. In a raid later that year, revenuers made five arrests and smashed a 1,000 gallon still. After that, the last permanent resident had left and the island became a hunting retreat. A clubhouse built on Poplar Island during the 1930s had two presidents among its vacationing guests, Franklin D. Roosevelt and Harry S. Truman. The clubhouse burned down in 1946.

By 1990, erosion had reduced the island's land to 5 acres (20,000 m^{2}), most of which was its southern piece, Coaches Island. Four tiny fragments to the north of Coaches Island were known as North Point, Middle Poplar and South Poplar.

=== Restoration with dredged material ===
Rebuilding Poplar Island.

Federal and state officials selected Poplar Island in the 1990s as a dumping site for material dredged from the shipping channels approaching Baltimore; dredge soil from Baltimore Harbor is polluted and is not being used in Poplar Island. The island when viewed in December 2017 on Google Earth satellite photos shows many odd colored pools of water and significant environmental degradation. Poplar island is not yet a "wildlife refuge."

This project is intended to implement the long-term restoration of the island while keeping the Chesapeake's deep-draft shipping channels open, maintaining Baltimore as a major port and halting the earlier practice of open-water dumping. The U.S. Army Corps of Engineers began reconstruction of the island in 1998 with the erection of dikes to contain the dredged material. As of January 2011, the project's total cost was estimated at $667 million and is scheduled to be completed in the year 2029.

The U.S. Fish and Wildlife Service initiated the Poplar Island restoration project, because it was concerned about the accelerating loss of "remote island habitat" in the Chesapeake Bay and the damaging effect it was having on birds, waterfowl and other wildlife. Poplar Island was seen as a mutually beneficial project because Baltimore and the Corps of Engineers, the lead agencies in the project, needed a new place to put dredge spoils, and the U.S. Fish and Wildlife Service needed new land. The agencies cooperated under the slogan of "economy and environment," because the project helps preserve the local economy (120,000 Maryland jobs depend on the port of Baltimore) while restoring precious habitat for the Chesapeake's wildlife.

Hart Miller Island, another highly eroded island in the Chesapeake Bay, received dredged material over a 25-year period. By 2009, this island had been restored to 1,140 acres (4,600,000 m^{2}) of wildlife habitat and recreation land.

Dredged material from shipping channels in the Chesapeake Bay may also be used to restore James Island, as part of the Mid-Bay Island Restoration Project. James Island, located at the mouth of the Little Choptank River, had eroded to three tiny fragments. The project's plans call for adding 2,000 acres (8,100,000 m^{2}) to James Island with dredged material in order to restore the island to its historic footprint. Work on James Island depends upon the project's inclusion in federal grants for the Water Resources Development Act, however, and funding had not yet been approved as of March 2011.

== Wildlife sanctuary ==
Since its reconstruction with dredged material began in 1998, Poplar Island had grown to 1,140 acres by 2005. Plans call for the addition of another 575 acres. Half of the island's acreage will be turned into wetlands and half into uplands. The project will use 68 million cubic yards of dredged material protected by 35,000 feet of containment dikes, built with 75% federal funding and 25% state funding. Only "clean" material, dredged from approach channels, is being used on Poplar Island. The Poplar Island restoration project will not use material dredged from close to Baltimore, which may be contaminated with heavy metals.

The island is the home of approximately 175 different species of birds, including terns and osprey. More than 1,000 diamondback terrapins have been reported hatching annually on the island in recent years.

Chesapeake Bay biologists consider Poplar Island's restoration to be a huge success for the diamondback terrapins, a brackish water turtle — and Maryland's “official state reptile.” Terrapins started laying eggs on the island almost as soon as construction workers started building the sand berms and beaches, and the island now hosts the nation's largest terrapin research and propagation project. Terrapins here enjoy a nearly 99 percent survival rate (compared with 10 percent or less elsewhere) because there are no foxes or raccoons, their major predators. This prompted the Fish and Wildlife Service to undertake an active environmental education and volunteer program on in the island, including the popular Terrapin Bay."

Both the Poplar Island and Hart-Miller Island restoration projects are overseen by the Maryland Environmental Service, an independent state agency responsible for solving Maryland's environmental challenges and conducting environmental preservation.
