= Heron Cars =

New Zealand car maker

Heron Cars were racing cars, sports and kit cars built in New Zealand between 1962 and 1999 by Ross Baker. They also included a one-off electric car.

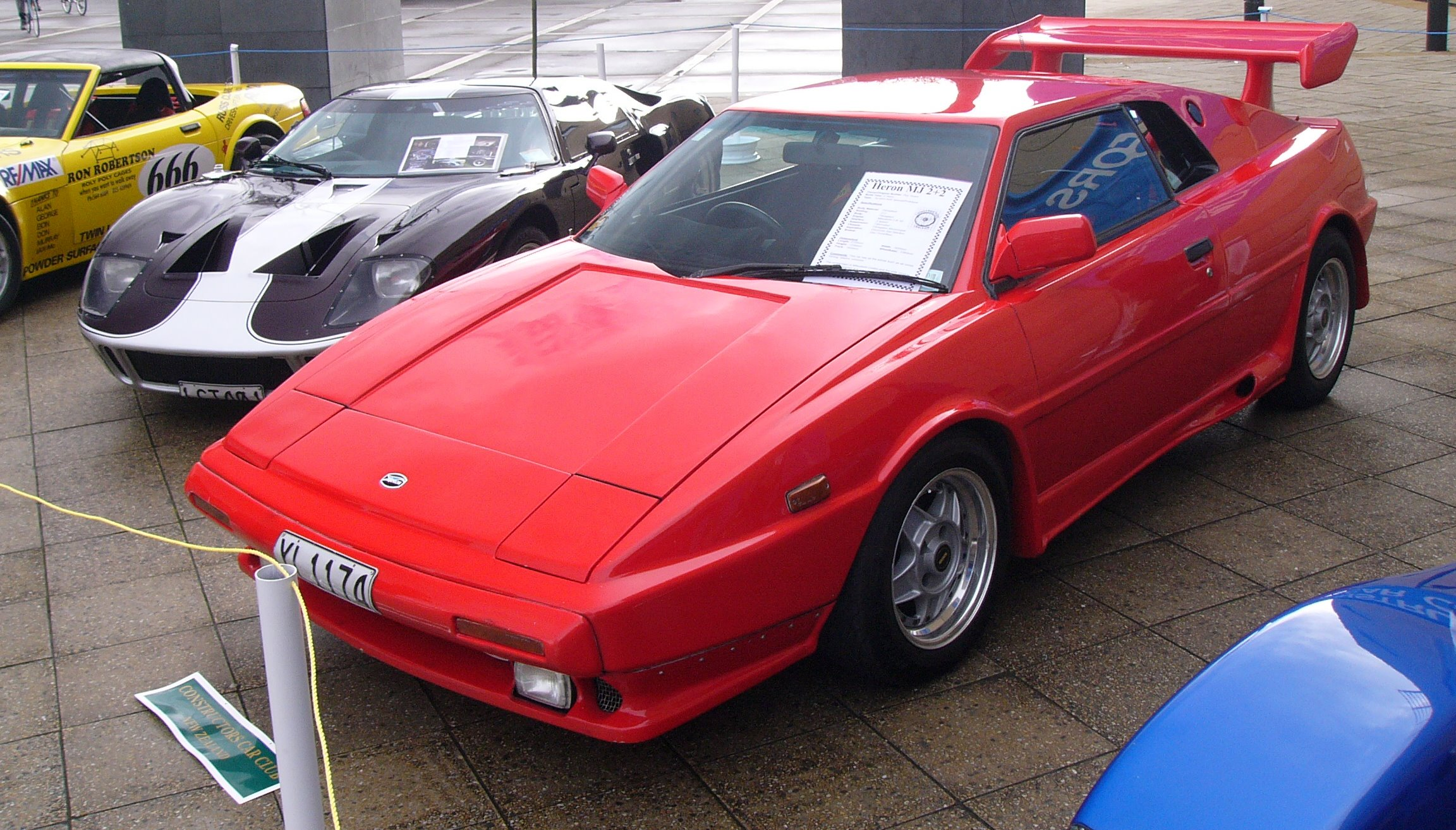
Heron MJ 1 2+2 coupe

== Models ==
=== MJ 1 ===
The MJ 1 was a two-seater mid-engined coupe designed in 1980 and with prototypes displayed at the 1981 Auckland motor show. Thirty-three orders were confirmed, and the first production version was built in 1984 with engine options ranging from a Fiat 125 4-cylinder engine to V8. Summit Engineering became involved in the Company to provide the necessary finance in return for a two-thirds share. The original concept was a very simple car using reconditioned parts supplied by the customer, with Heron assembling them into a complete roadworthy car. Summit wanted the cars built completely by Summit using mainly new parts. Problems then began to occur with production, causing rising costs, and the MJ1's final demise was caused in 1985 by imported Japanese motor vehicles such as the Mazda RX-7 costing less. Finally in a fairly acrimonious mood, Baker brought back the two-thirds share from Summit.

There are known to be 6 prototypes and 19 production models of the MJ1. The largest collection of these cars is owned by Alan and Bernadette Wichman and their son Tomoavao Wichman, of Hamilton, New Zealand.

=== MJ 2+2 ===
The MJ 2+2 was designed in 1985, but none made until 1998 when Roy Hoare approached Baker about building one. There were no moulds, so Hoare agreed to pay to have the moulds made if he could have a body shell. Baker made the moulds and a body. Baker also made an extra body, which was fitted with a Rover V8, motor and five-speed Subaru gearbox. Only two were made.

=== XR1 racing car ===
Designed in 1985 and completed in 1990, it was basically a roofless MJ1 with a 3.5-litre Rover V8 engine. It had a very light aluminium monocoque chassis, Triumph Vitesse front suspension, a five-speed Heron/Škoda gearbox, and unequal length wishbones on the rear.

=== Mark 1 racing car ===
A replica of the Lotus 23B sports car. Designed in 1962 and built in 1963 with Bob Gee, an experienced boat racer, assisting Baker. It used a Ford Cortina 1500cc engine with twin 45 mm Weber carbs and a Volkswagen 4-speed transaxle. The overall weight of the car was 450 kg. Only one was built.

=== Mark 2/3 racing car ===
Ken Richardson, Bob Gee, and Baker built the Mark 2/3 in 1965 and also based on the Lotus 23B but originally intended to use a Chevrolet Turbo-Air 6 engine and gearbox from a Chevrolet Corvair. The Corvair engine was unavailable so a Daimler Dart 2558cc V8 connected to a Citroën DS 19 gearbox was installed instead. Three were made, one each for Richardson, Gee, and Baker - this also explains the 3 in the name.

=== GT Mark 4 racing car ===
Building commenced in 1967 and finally finished in 1988. It was a replica of the Ford GT Mk4. Powered by a Chevrolet Corvette 327 cu in V8 and running a gearbox designed by Heron.

=== PC 80 ===
This car was built for Powerco/ECNZ, the electric supply company in 1995.

== Other ==
Heron also specialised in modifying vehicles for use by the disabled, made small electric trucks, and spray units for orchards.
