= Heron Lake =

Heron Lake can refer to:

- Heron Lake, Minnesota, a small city in the United States
- Heron Lake (Jackson County, Minnesota)
- Heron Lake (New Mexico), a reservoir in Rio Arriba County
