= Tizzard Island =

Island

- Tizzard Island's location in Maryland

Geography
- Location: Chincoteague Bay
- Coordinates: 38.077°N 75.336°W
- Area: 0.26 sq mi (0.67 km^{2})
- Coastline: 2.64 mi (4.25 km)

Administration
- United States

Tizzard Island is a inhabited island in Chincoteague Bay. A upkept house is located at 38.073281, -75.332458 via Google Maps. The island is within the borders of Worcester County in the state of Maryland. Several structures exist on Tizzard Island, though none of them are inhabited and many of them are decaying.
