= USS Heron =

USS Heron has been the name of more than one United States Navy ship, and may refer to:

- USS Heron (AM-10), a minesweeper in commission from 1918 to 1922 and later in commission as a seaplane tender (AVP-2) from 1924 to 1946
- USS Heron (AMS-18), a minesweeper in commission as USS YMS-369 from 1943 to 1946, renamed USS Heron (AMS-18) in 1947, and in commission again from 1949 to 1955, redesignated as MSC(O)-18 in 1955
- USS Heron (MHC-52) a coastal minehunter in commission from 1994 to 2007
