= Carpenters Island (St. Mary's County, Maryland) =

Coordinates: 38.30°N 76.72°W

Carpenters Island was an island located at the head of St. Clement's Bay in St. Mary's County, Maryland, patented in 1847 to Susan E. Carpenter, Amanda Carpenter, Rebecca Carpenter, and Matilda Carpenter and certified in the name of William Carpenter. The land patented included surrounding waters and measured one and three quarter acres. In 2005, the island was included in a list of "lost islands" of the Chesapeake Bay, which is situated between Maryland and Virginia in the United States.
