= Héron =

Municipality in Liège Province, Wallonia, Belgium

Héron Héron (Walloon)
- Municipality
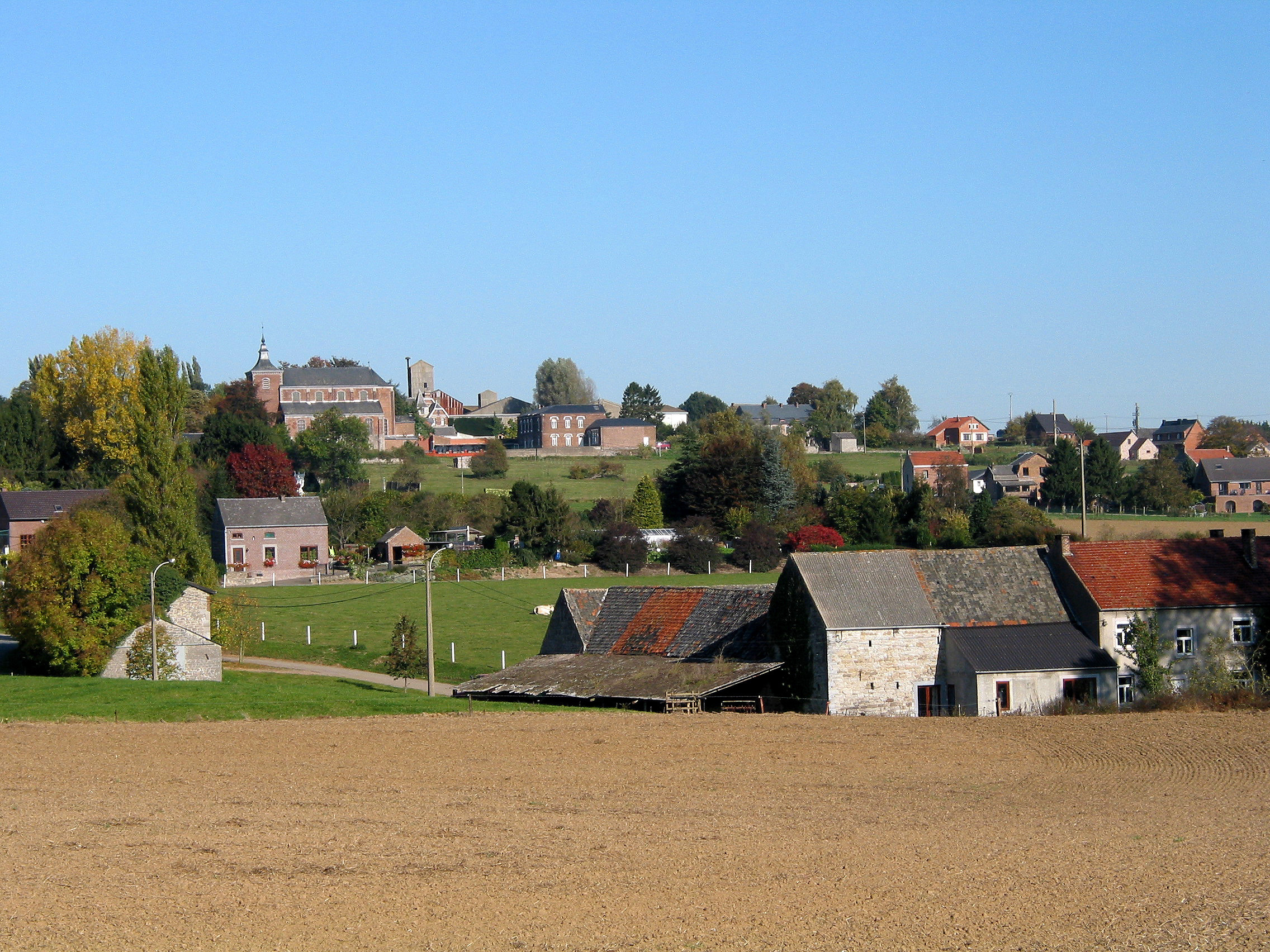

- Flag Coat of arms

- Location of Héron in the province of Liège
- Interactive map of Héron
- Location in Belgium
- Coordinates: 50°33′N 05°05′E
- Country: Belgium
- Community: French Community
- Region: Wallonia
- Province: Liège
- Arrondissement: Huy

Government
  - Mayor: Eric Hautphenne (PS)
  - Governing party: LB-Ecolo OuVert

Area
  - Total: 38.41 km^{2} (14.83 sq mi)

Population (2018-01-01)
  - Total: 5,277
  - Density: 137.4/km^{2} (355.8/sq mi)
- Postal codes: 4217, 4218
- NIS code: 61028
- Area codes: 085
- Website: www.heron.be

Héron (French pronunciation: [eʁɔ̃]; Walloon: Héron) is a municipality of Wallonia located in the province of Liège, Belgium.

== Geography ==
Héron is located on the river Mehaigne.

The municipality consists of the following districts: Couthuin, Héron, Lavoir, and Waret-l'Évêque.

== Demography ==
On 1 January 2006 Héron had a total population of 4,534. The total area is 38.32 km^{2} which gives a population density of 118 inhabitants per km^{2}.

== Facilities ==
Héron is home to Couthuin Airport.

== Gallery ==
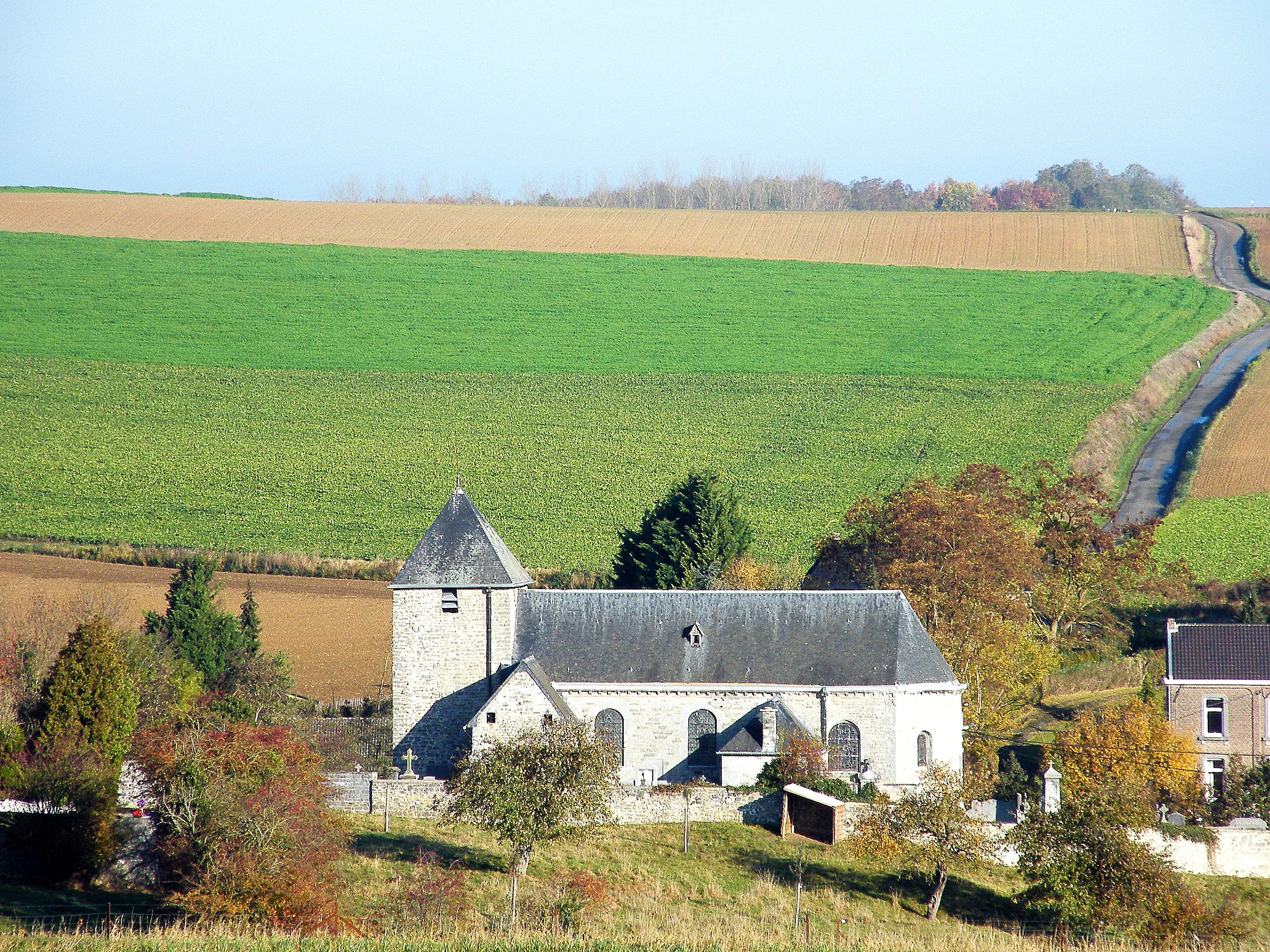
Saint Hubertus church in Lavoir

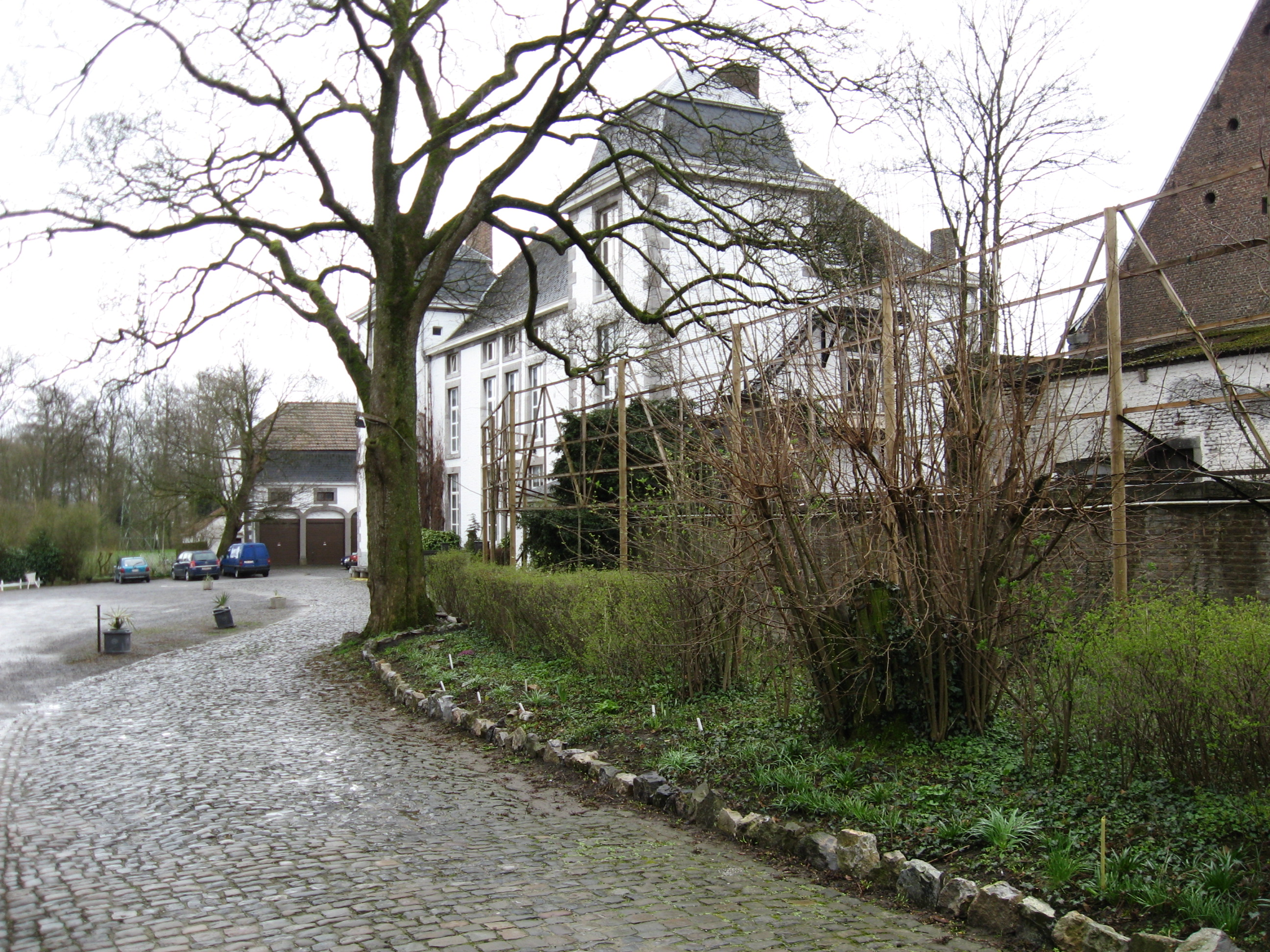
Potesta castle in Envoz

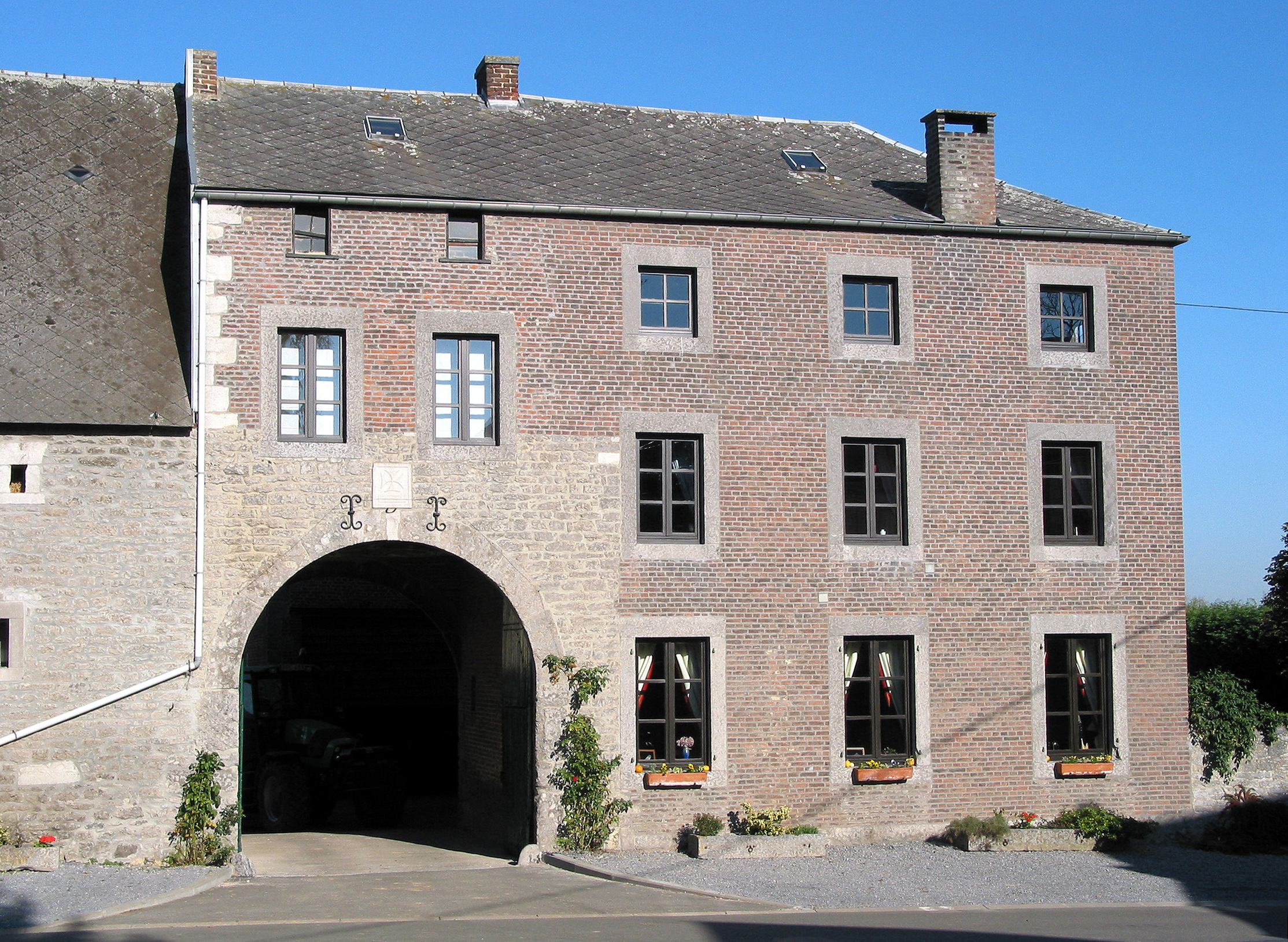
Typical old farm in Héron (17th century).
