= Assacorkin Island =

Island

- Assacorkin Island's location in Maryland

Geography
- Location: Chincoteague Bay
- Coordinates: 38.060°N 75.317°W
- Area: 299,200 sq ft (27,800 m^{2})
- Coastline: 3,193 ft (973.2 m)

Administration
- United States

Assacorkin Island is an uninhabited island in Chincoteague Bay. The island is within the borders of Worcester County in the state of Maryland. Assacorkin Island is located just northeast of the larger Mills Island.
