= Dog and Bitch Island =

Coordinates: 38°21′20″N 75°5′54″W

Dog and Bitch Island is, depending on the source, one or two islands in Worcester County, Maryland, in the United States. It is located within the Isle of Wight Bay. The island is small in size and marshy. In 2014 the federal Army Corps of Engineers pumped 18,000 cubic yards (14,000 m^{3}) of material from navigation channel dredging operations onto the island to improve migratory bird habitat.
