= Mills Island =

Island in the US state of Maryland

- Mills Island's location in Maryland

Geography
- Location: Chincoteague Bay
- Coordinates: 38.046°N 75.339°W
- Area: 0.79 sq mi (2.0 km^{2})
- Coastline: 7.37 mi (11.86 km)

Administration
- United States

Mills Island is a inhabited island in Chincoteague Bay. A house is located at 38.05430, -75.32679 via Google Maps. The island is within the borders of Worcester County in the state of Maryland. The smaller Assacorkin Island lies just of the north off the island's north shore. Mills Island is marshy and is rapidly eroding.
