= Fishing Bay =

- Location within Maryland Location within the United States
- Location: Dorchester County, Maryland
- Coordinates: 38°18′11″N 76°01′14″W
- Type: Bay
- Part of: Chesapeake Bay

Fishing Bay is a large saltwater bay in Dorchester County, Maryland. From tributaries to its north in the Blackwater National Wildlife Refuge and Fishing Bay Wildlife Management Area, it flows south into the Chesapeake Bay. Its borders are formed by Elliot's Island to the east, and the greater bulk of Dorchester County to the west.
