= Newport Bay (Maryland) =

- Location within Maryland Location within the United States
- Location: Worcester County, Maryland
- Coordinates: 38°13′56″N 75°13′5″W
- Type: Bay
- Surface elevation: 0 feet (0 m)

Newport Bay is an arm of Chincoteague Bay between the mainland of Worcester County, Maryland and Sinepuxent Neck; its principal tributaries are Newport Creek and Trappe Creek.

The names Newport Bay and Newport Creek refer to a tract of land on the creek, "Newport Pagnell", patented in the late 17th century, which in turn commemorated the town of the same name in Buckinghamshire. Newport Bay has also been known as Mobjack Bay.
