= Ragged Island (Maryland) =

Island in Maryland, United States

Coordinates: 38°32′12″N 76°16′36″W

Ragged Island is an island in Dorchester County, Maryland, United States. It is located in Chesapeake Bay, on the western coast of Delmarva Peninsula, and covers an area of 106 acres (0.43 km^{2}). It has a maximum elevation of 36 feet (11 m) above the sea level. An airport is located on the northern part of the island.

In 1995, the island was purchased by a Maryland couple, Richard and Ellen Bernstein.
