= Hart Miller Island =

Island in Maryland, U.S.

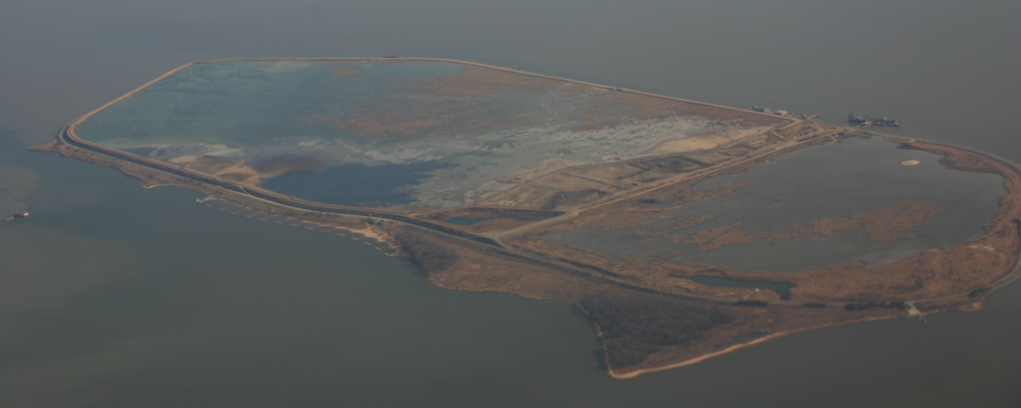
- Oblique air photo of Hart Miller Island, Chesapeake Bay, Maryland, looking east in 2006.
- Interactive map of Hart Miller Island

Geography
- Location: Chesapeake Bay
- Coordinates: 39°15′06″N 76°22′23″W

Administration
- United States
- State: Maryland
- County: Baltimore

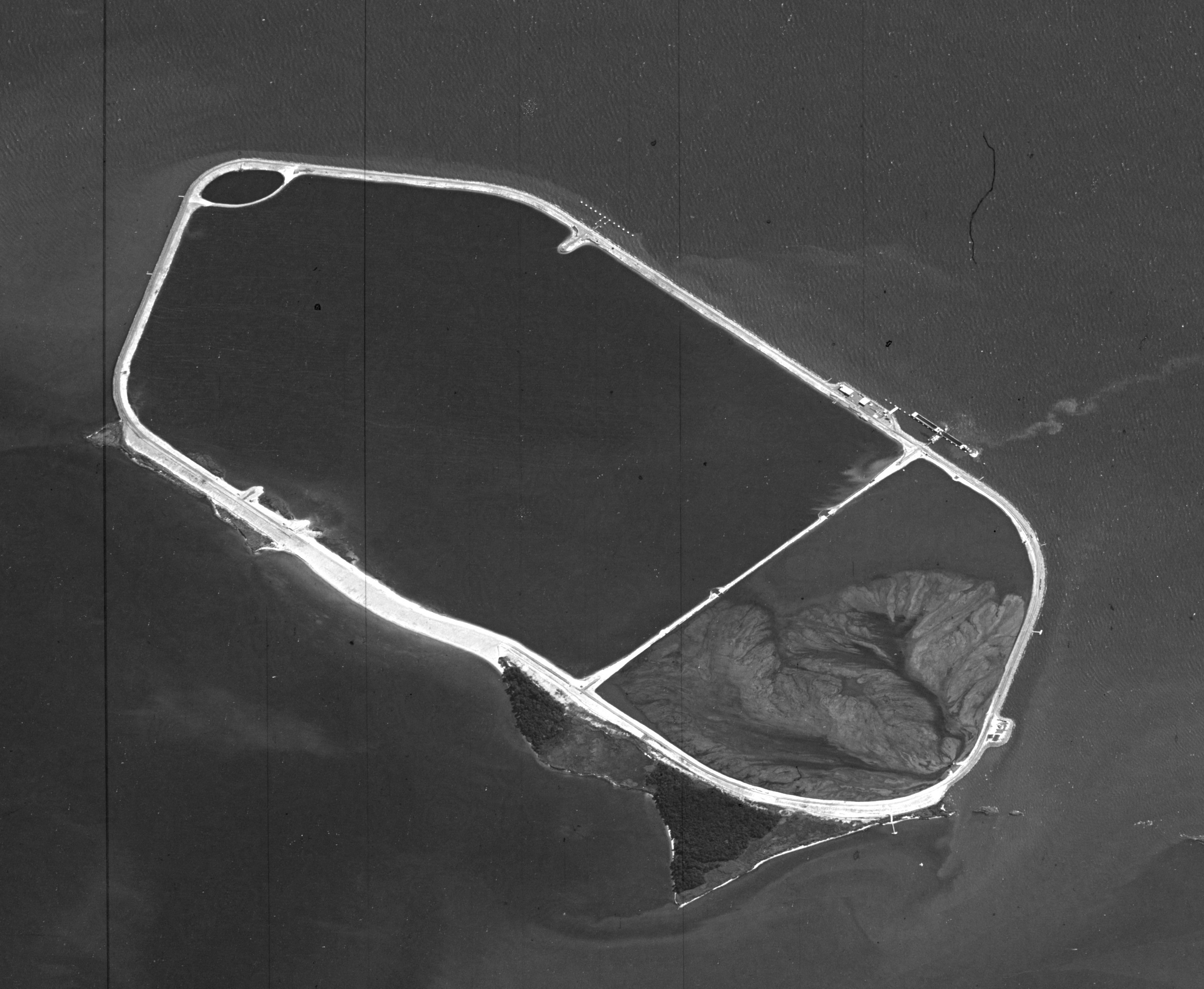
Hart Miller Island in 1984, not long after construction began.

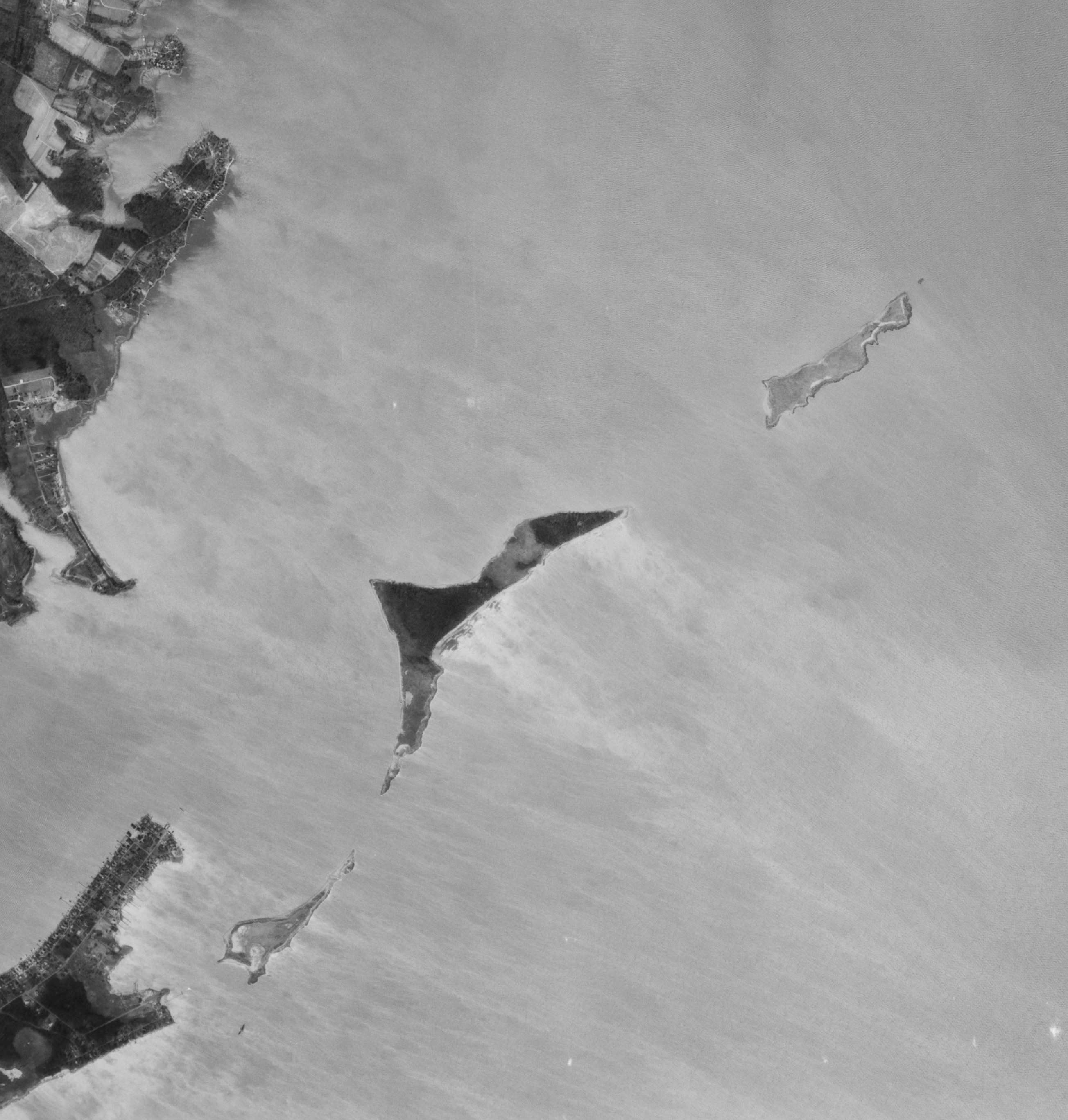
Hart Island (center) and Miller Island (upper right) in 1977.

Hart Miller Island is located at the mouths of Back River and Middle River, where they empty into the Chesapeake Bay east of the City of Baltimore in Maryland. It was formerly two separate islands, Hart Island and Miller Island, but it is now almost entirely artificial. In 1981, the area began being filled with dredged material by the U.S. Army Corps of Engineers, for the purpose of habitat restoration, and the project was completed in 2012. It is now in use as Hart-Miller Island State Park, accessible only by boat.

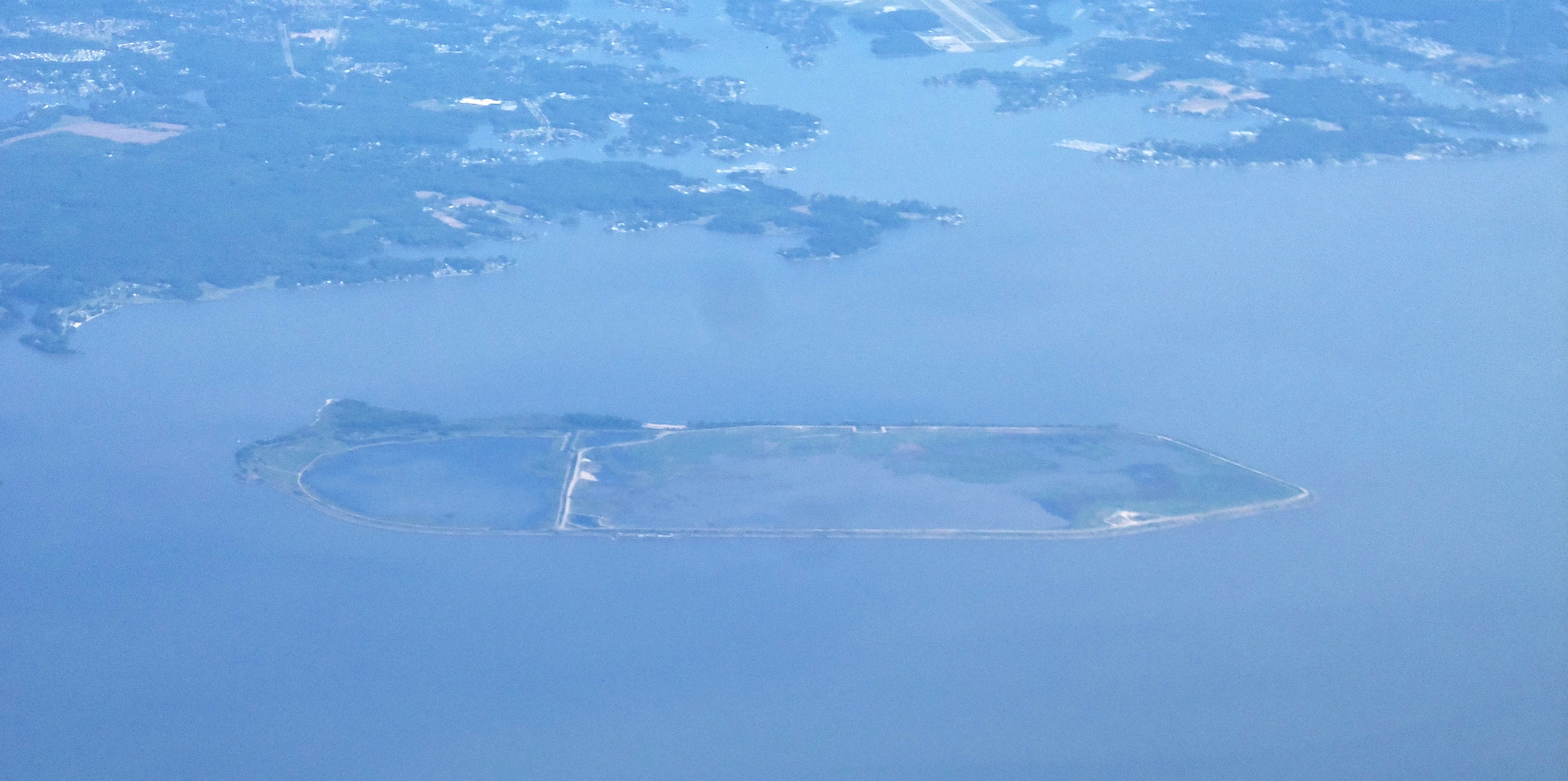
Hart-Miller Island in 2021
