= Heron Island (Maryland) =

Island of Potomac River

Coordinates: 38°12′59.65″N 76°43′29.25″W

Heron Island is a sandbar located in the Potomac River east-north-east of Saint Clement's Island in St. Mary's County, Maryland, United States. The closest town is Colton's Point, Maryland, 1/2 mile to the north. The island is named for the large numbers of herons seen by the European colonists when they arrived in 1634.
