= Harris Creek =

Harris Creek may refer to:

- Harris Creek (British Columbia)
- Harris Creek (Baltimore), passes beneath Canton, Baltimore in a culvert
- Harris Creek (Maryland)
- Harris Creek (Missouri)
- Harris Creek (Montana), a stream in Flathead County, Montana
- Harris Creek (Valley River tributary), a stream in Cherokee County, North Carolina

== See also ==
- Harris Branch (disambiguation)
