= Harris Creek (Maryland) =

River in Maryland, United States

Coordinates: 38°44′20″N 76°18′22″W

Harris Creek (Maryland) is a tidal creek on the eastern shore of Maryland. It is a location for oyster restoration.

Harris Creek was named for William Harris, a 19th-century landowner.

== Location ==
It flows from north to south into the Chesapeake Bay, in Talbot County, Maryland, near Tilghman Island.

== Oyster restoration ==
The Nature Conservancy, and the Oyster Recovery Partnership, Maryland Department of Natural Resources, the National Oceanographic and Atmospheric Administration, and the U.S. Army Corps of Engineers planted oyster spat on 350 underwater acres. Planting began in 2012. Water quality is measured with a vertical profiler and water quality sondes moored at the bottom. In 2013, 112,500 tons of fossilized oyster shell were transported from Florida, and 42,536 tons of the shell went into Harris Creek (the rest went to the Little Choptank River.
