= Harris Branch =

Harris Branch may refer to:

- Harris Branch (Brazil Creek), a stream in Missouri
- Harris Branch (Flat River), a stream in Missouri
- Harris Branch (Austin, Texas), a stream in Austin, Texas
