= Captain John Smith Chesapeake National Historic Trail =

Series of water routes in the United States

- Location within Virginia Location within the United States
- Location: Delaware, Maryland, Virginia, & District of Columbia, USA
- Coordinates: 38°0′0″N 76°0′0″W
- Established: December 19, 2006
- Governing body: National Park Service
- Website: Captain John Smith Chesapeake National Historic Trail

The Captain John Smith Chesapeake National Historic Trail is a series of water routes in the United States extending approximately 3,000 miles (4,800 km) along the Chesapeake Bay, the nation's largest estuary, and its tributaries in Virginia, Maryland, Delaware, and in the District of Columbia. The historic routes trace the 1607–1609 voyages of Captain John Smith to chart the land and waterways of the Chesapeake. Along with the Star-Spangled Banner National Historic Trail, it is one of two water trails designated as National Historic Trails.

Four connecting trails designated in 2012 extend the trail up the Susquehanna River, Chester River, Upper Nanticoke River, and Upper James River.

== Creation ==
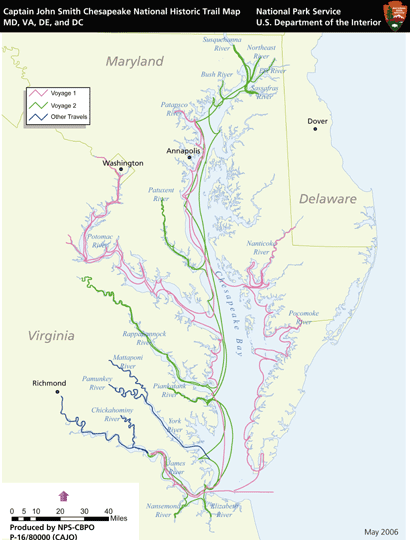
Trail map

The Captain John Smith Chesapeake National Historic Trail was established on December 19, 2006, by Pub. L. 109–418 (text) (PDF) after a year of feasibility studies undertaken by the National Park Service and authorized by the United States Congress. Pressure to create the trail came from bipartisan legislation initially introduced in the Senate in August 2005. This suggestion rapidly gained support and was approved by the Subcommittee on National Parks in May 2006. The Senate Subcommittee's approval provoked a House companion bill, sponsored by Representative Jo Ann Davis and co-sponsored by 27 representatives, which was finally passed by the House on December 6, 2006, and by the Senate two days later. President George W. Bush signed the bill into law on December 19, 2006.

The bay-area water trail is part of the National Trails System and is administered by the National Park Service, in coordination with the Chesapeake Bay Gateways and Watertrails Network and the federal-state Chesapeake Bay Program.

== See also ==
- Chesapeake Bay Interpretive Buoy System
