= Chesapeake Bay Interpretive Buoy System =

Network of observational buoys

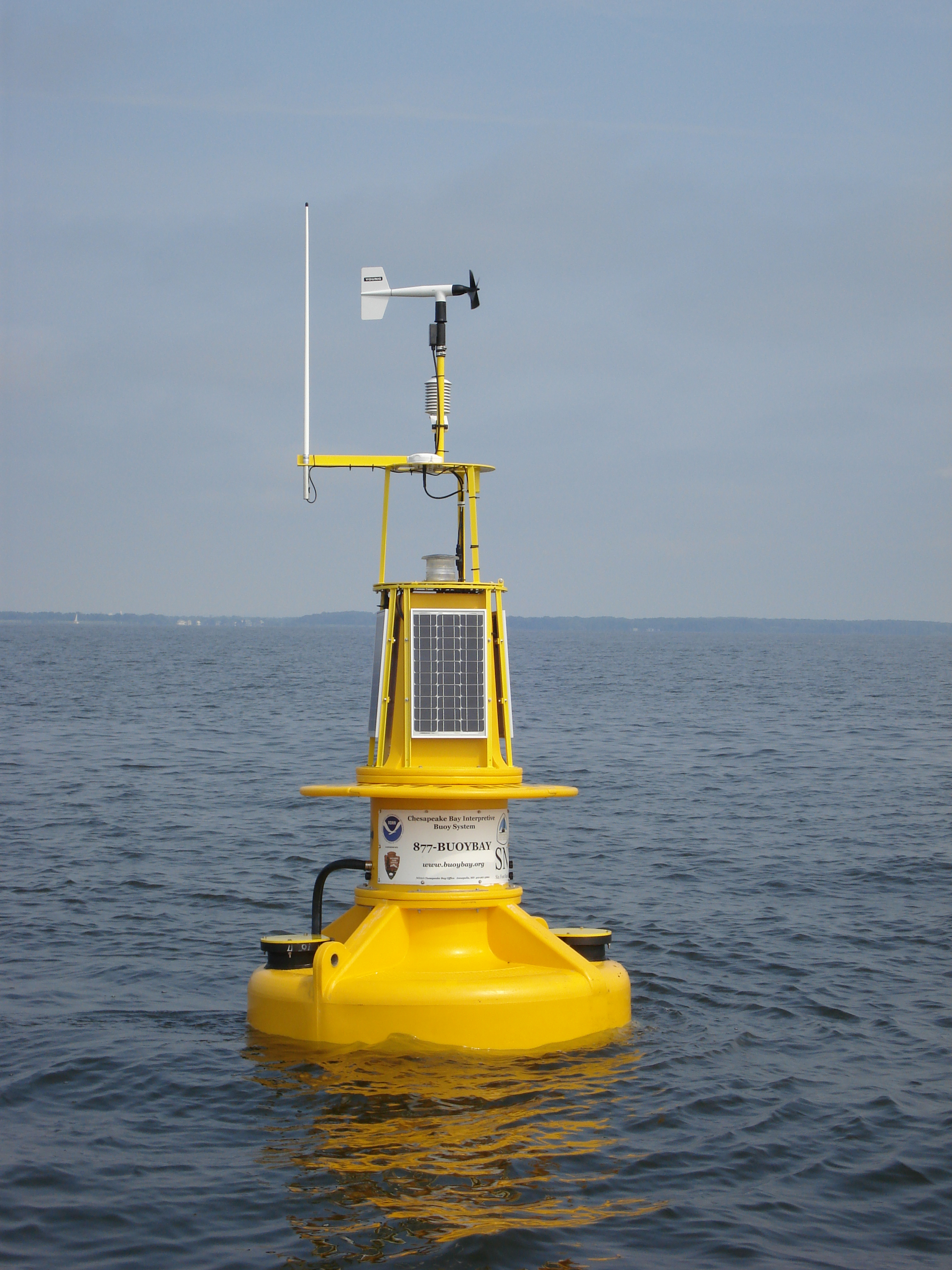
The Patapsco River Chesapeake Bay Interpretive Buoy System smart buoy

Chesapeake Bay Interpretive Buoy System (CBIBS) is a network of observational buoys that are deployed throughout the Chesapeake Bay to observe the estuary's changing conditions and to serve as way points along the Captain John Smith Chesapeake National Historic Trail. They are maintained by the United States National Oceanic and Atmospheric Administration (NOAA). These "smart buoys" observe and record meteorological, oceanographic and water quality data which can be obtained in real-time by using mobile apps or by visiting http://buoybay.noaa.gov/. CBIBS is an operational buoy system in the Chesapeake Bay dedicated to maintaining a broad range of measurements necessary to track Bay restoration progress.

== Location of the buoys ==
The system's operational buoys are located:

- at the mouth of the Severn River (near Annapolis, Maryland) 38.9631°N 76.4475°W
- off the mouth of the Little Choptank River at Gooses Reef 38°33.375′N 76°24.882′W
- at the mouth of the Potomac River (near Point Lookout, Maryland) 38.033°N 76.3355°W
- at the mouth of the Rappahannock River (near Stingray Point and Deltaville, Virginia) 37.5517°N 76.2514°W
- at the mouth of the York River (near Perrin, VA) 37.20063 N 76.26598 W
- in the James River (near Jamestown, Virginia) 37.20417°N 76.7775°W

Other buoys have been deployed in the past, at:

- at the mouth of the Susquehanna River (near Havre de Grace, Maryland) 39°32.541′N 76°04.495′W
- at the mouth of the Patapsco River (near Baltimore) 39.15191°N 76.39115°W
- in the Elizabeth River (near Norfolk, Virginia) 36.8455°N 76.298°W
- at the mouth of the Chesapeake Bay (near Cape Henry, Virginia) 36.9793°N 76.0436°W
- in the Upper Potomac River south of the Woodrow Wilson Bridge (near Alexandria, Virginia) 38°47′15.6″N 77°02′08.34″W

== Types of data observed ==
The buoys observe and record a wide variety of meteorological, oceanographic, and water quality real-time data including air temperature, relative humidity, barometric pressure, wind speed and direction, wave height and direction, currents, water temperature, salinity, dissolved oxygen, chlorophyll, and turbidity. Anyone can obtain the data by using mobile apps or by going to http://buoybay.noaa.gov/.

Some buoys have an instrument that can track the passage of Atlantic sturgeon and other fish tagged by scientists.

== Relationship to other ocean observing systems ==
CBIBS is a component of the Chesapeake Bay Observing System (CBOS) and the U.S. Integrated Ocean Observing System (IOOS).

== Partners ==
A variety of partners have helped with the Chesapeake Bay Interpretive Buoy System over the years, including the U.S. Coast Guard and Coast Guard Auxiliary, the National Park Service, the Maryland Department of Natural Resources, the U.S. Army Corps of Engineers, the Chesapeake Conservancy, the Conservation Fund, the National Geographic Society, the Chesapeake Bay Foundation, the Friends of the John Smith Chesapeake Trail, Dominion Power, Virginia Commonwealth University, and the Nauticus museum (located in Norfolk, Virginia).

== Data users ==
CBIBS data is relied on by a variety of users including meteorologists, recreational boaters, fishermen, commercial mariners, scientists, educators, and natural resource decision makers.

== Link to the National Historic Trail ==
In addition to providing real-time data about the Bay's changing conditions, CBIBS also marks and interprets the Captain John Smith Chesapeake National Historic Trail, the first water trail in the National Historic Trail System. This trail is administered by the National Park Service and commemorates Captain Smith's exploratory voyages in the Bay during the summer of 1607 and 1608.
