= Chesapeake Bay =

Estuary in the U.S. states of Maryland and Virginia

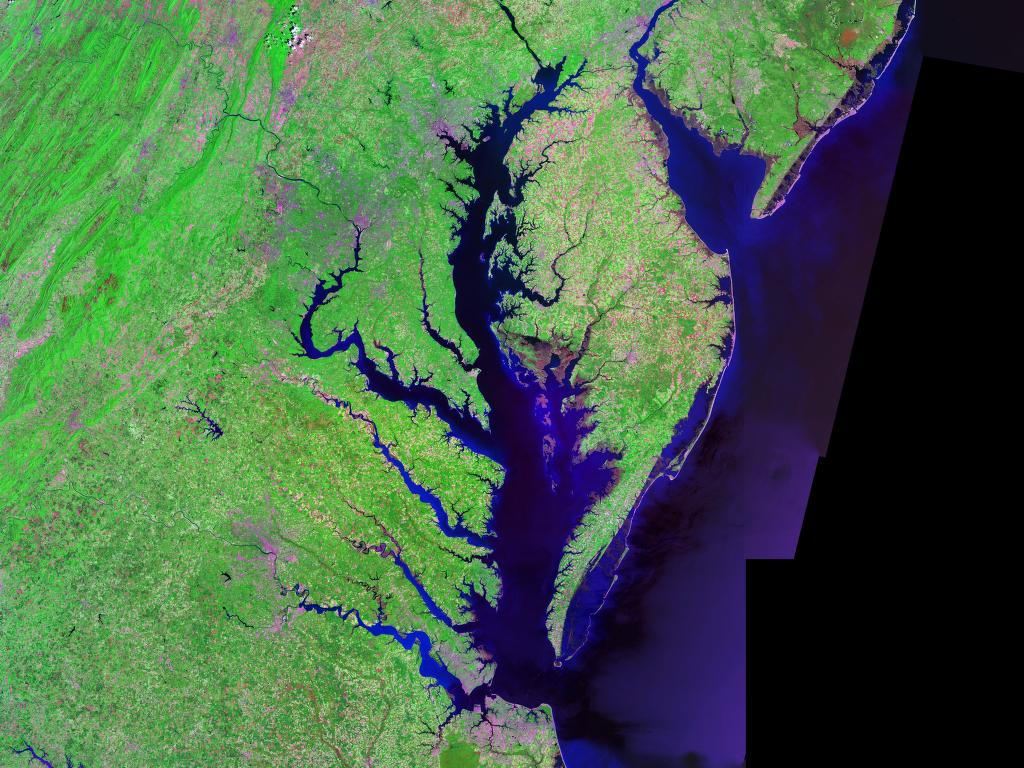
- A satellite image of the Chesapeake Bay

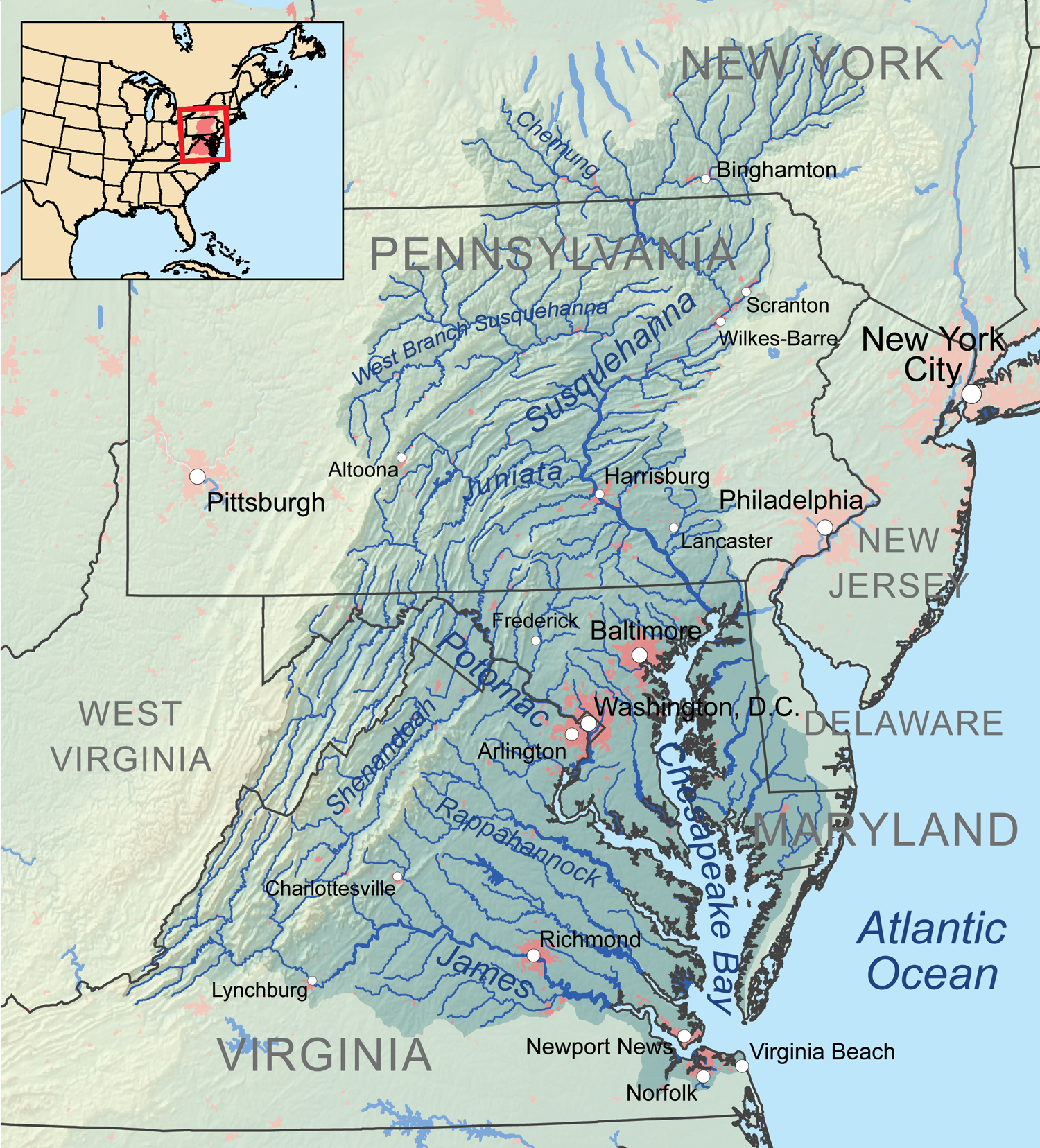
- The Chesapeake Bay drainage basin extends into six states, Maryland, Virginia, West Virginia, Delaware, Pennsylvania, and New York, and the federal capital of Washington, D.C.

- Location within Virginia
- Location: Maryland and Virginia
- Coordinates: 37.8°N 76.1°W
- Type: Estuary
- Etymology: Chesepiooc, Algonquian for village 'at a big river'
- Primary inflows: Susquehanna River mouth east of Havre de Grace, Maryland
- River sources: Deer Creek, Bush River, Gunpowder River, Back River, Patapsco River, Severn River, Patuxent River, Potomac River, Rappahannock River, York River, James River, Chester River, Choptank River, Nanticoke River, Pocomoke River, Susquehanna River
- Primary outflows: Atlantic Ocean north of Virginia Beach, Virginia; 36°59′45″N 75°57′34″W
- Catchment area: 64,299 sq mi (166,530 km^{2})
- Basin countries: United States
- Max. length: 200 mi (320 km)
- Max. width: 30 mi (48 km)
- Surface area: 4,479 sq mi (11,600 km^{2})
- Average depth: 21 ft (6.4 m)
- Residence time: 180 days (Note: Residence time ranges from 110 to 264 days with an average of 180 days based on circulation in the years 1980 to 2012.)
- Settlements: Annapolis, Baltimore, Cambridge, Cape Charles, Chesapeake, Chesapeake Beach, Elkton, Hampton, Havre de Grace, Newport News, Norfolk, Portsmouth, Virginia Beach
- References

Ramsar Wetland
- Official name: Chesapeake Bay Estuarine Complex
- Designated: 4 June 1987
- Reference no.: 375

The Chesapeake Bay (/ˈtʃɛsəpiːk/ CHESS-ə-peek) is the largest estuary in the United States. The bay is located in the Mid-Atlantic region and is primarily separated from the Atlantic Ocean by the Delmarva Peninsula, including parts of the Eastern Shore of Maryland, the Eastern Shore of Virginia, and the state of Delaware. The mouth of the bay at its southern point is located between Cape Henry and Cape Charles. With its northern portion in Maryland and the southern part in Virginia, the Chesapeake Bay is a very important feature for the ecology and economy of those two states, as well as others surrounding within its watershed. More than 150 major rivers and streams flow through the bay's 64,299-square-mile (166,534 km^{2}) drainage basin, which covers parts of six states (New York, Pennsylvania, Delaware, Maryland, Virginia, and West Virginia) and all of Washington, D.C.

The bay is approximately 200 miles (320 km) long from its northern headwaters in the Susquehanna River to its outlet in the Atlantic Ocean. It is 2.8 miles (4.5 km) wide at its narrowest (between Kent County's Plum Point near Newtown in the east and the Harford County western shore near Romney Creek) and 30 miles (48 km) at its widest (just south of the mouth of the Potomac River, which divides Maryland from Virginia). Its total shoreline including tributaries is 11,684 miles (18,804 km), surrounding a surface area of 4,479 square miles (11,601 km^{2}). Average depth is 21 feet (6.4 m), reaching a maximum of 174 feet (53 m). The bay is spanned twice, in Maryland by the Chesapeake Bay Bridge from Sandy Point (near Annapolis) to Kent Island and in Virginia by the Chesapeake Bay Bridge–Tunnel connecting Virginia Beach to Cape Charles.

Known for both its beauty and bounty, the bay has become "emptier", with fewer crabs, oysters and watermen (fishermen) since the mid-20th century. Nutrient pollution and urban runoff have been identified as major components of impaired water quality in the bay, stressing ecosystems and compounding the decline of shellfish due to overharvesting. Restoration efforts that began in the 1990s have continued into the 21st century and show potential for growth of the native oyster population. The health of the Chesapeake Bay improved in 2015, marking three years of gains over a four-year period. Slight improvements in water quality were observed in 2021, compared to indicators measured in 2020. The bay is experiencing other environmental concerns, including climate change, which is causing sea level rise that erodes coastal areas and infrastructure and changes the marine ecosystem.

== Etymology ==
The word Chesepiooc is an Algonquian word referring to a village 'at a big river'. It is the seventh-oldest surviving English placename in the United States, first applied as Chesepiook by explorers heading north from the Roanoke Colony into a Chesapeake tributary in 1585 or 1586. The name may also refer to the Chesapeake people or the Chesepian, a Native American tribe who inhabited the area now known as South Hampton Roads in the U.S. state of Virginia. They occupied an area that is now the Norfolk, Portsmouth, Chesapeake, and Virginia Beach areas. In 2005, Algonquian linguist Blair Rudes "helped to dispel one of the area's most widely held beliefs: that 'Chesapeake' means something like 'great shellfish bay'. It does not, Rudes said. The name might have actually meant something like 'great water', or it might have just referred to a village location at the bay's mouth."

The first European name for the bay was "Bahia de Santa Maria" (St. Mary's bay). This name was coined by the Spanish.

== Physical geography ==
=== Geology and formation ===
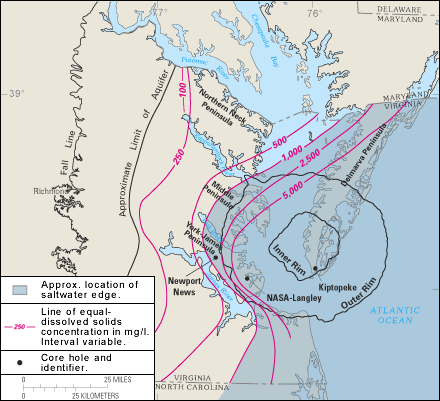
Boundaries of the Chesapeake Bay impact crater.

The Chesapeake Bay is an estuary to the North Atlantic, lying between the Delmarva Peninsula to the east and the North American mainland to the west. It is the ria, or drowned valley, of the Susquehanna River, meaning that it was the alluvial plain where the river flowed when the sea level was lower. It is not a fjord, because the Laurentide Ice Sheet never reached as far south as the northernmost point on the bay. North of Baltimore, the western shore borders the hilly Piedmont region of Maryland; south of the city the bay lies within the state's low-lying coastal plain, with sedimentary cliffs to the west, and flat islands, winding creeks and marshes to the east. The large rivers entering the bay from the west have broad mouths and are extensions of the main ria for miles up the course of each river.

The bay's geology, its present form, and its very location were created by a bolide impact event at the end of the Eocene (about 35.5 million years ago), forming the Chesapeake Bay impact crater and much later the Susquehanna River valley. The bay was formed starting about 10,000 years ago when rising sea levels at the end of the last ice age flooded the Susquehanna River valley. Parts of the bay, especially the Calvert County, Maryland, coastline, are lined by cliffs composed of deposits from receding waters millions of years ago. These cliffs, generally known as Calvert Cliffs, are famous for their fossils, especially fossilized shark teeth, which are commonly found washed up on the beaches next to the cliffs. Scientists' Cliffs is a beach community in Calvert County named for the desire to create a retreat for scientists when the community was founded in 1935.

=== Hydrology ===
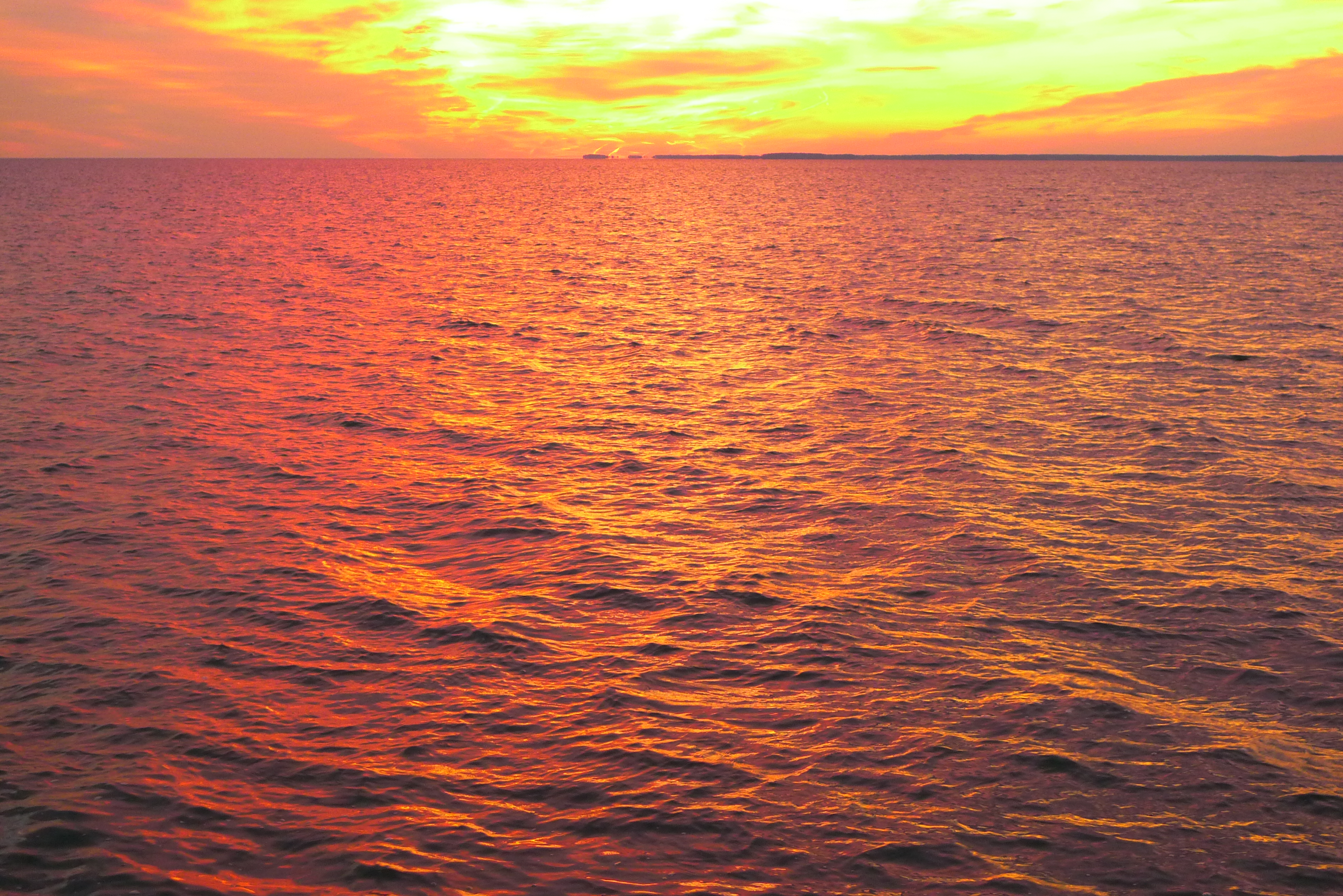
View of the eastern bay in Maryland at sunset

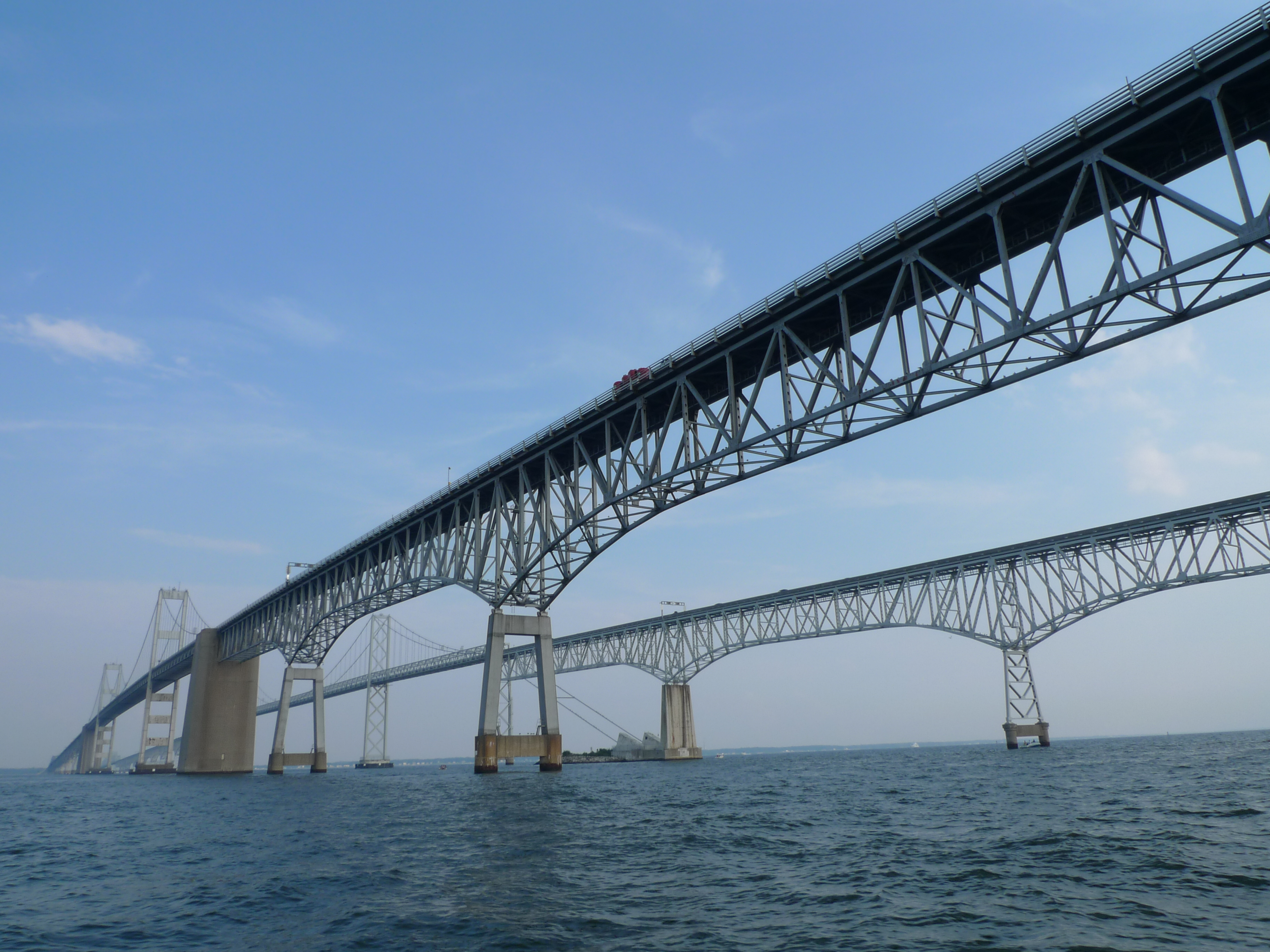
The Chesapeake Bay Bridge, near Annapolis, Maryland

Much of the bay is shallow. At the point where the Susquehanna River flows into the bay, the average depth is 30 feet (9 m), although this soon diminishes to an average of 10 feet (3 m) southeast of the city of Havre de Grace, Maryland, to about 35 feet (11 m) just north of Annapolis. On average, the depth of the bay is 21 feet (6.4 m), including tributaries; over 24 percent of the bay is less than 6 ft (2 m) deep.

Because the bay is an estuary, it has fresh water, salt water and brackish water. Brackish water has three salinity zones: oligohaline, mesohaline, and polyhaline. The freshwater zone runs from the mouth of the Susquehanna River to north Baltimore. The oligohaline zone has very little salt. Salinity varies from 0.5 ppt (parts per thousand) to 10 ppt, and freshwater species can survive there. The north end of the oligohaline zone is north Baltimore and the south end is the Chesapeake Bay Bridge. The mesohaline zone has a medium amount of salt and runs from the Bay Bridge to the mouth of the Rappahannock River. Salinity there ranges from 1.07% to 1.8%. The polyhaline zone is the saltiest zone, and some of the water can be as salty as sea water. It runs from the mouth of the Rappahannock River to the mouth of the bay. The salinity ranges from 1.87% to 3.6%. (3.6% is as salty as the ocean.)

The climate of the area surrounding the bay is primarily humid subtropical, with hot, very humid summers and cold to mild winters. Only the area around the mouth of the Susquehanna River is continental in nature, and the mouth of the Susquehanna River and the Susquehanna flats often freeze in winter. It is rare for the surface of the bay to freeze in winter, something that happened most recently in the winter of 1976–77.

The Chesapeake Bay is the end point of over 150 rivers and streams. The largest rivers flowing directly into the bay, in order of discharge, are the Susquehanna River, Potomac River, James River, Rappahannock River, York River, Patuxent River, and Choptank River.

For more information on Chesapeake Bay rivers, see the List of Chesapeake Bay rivers.

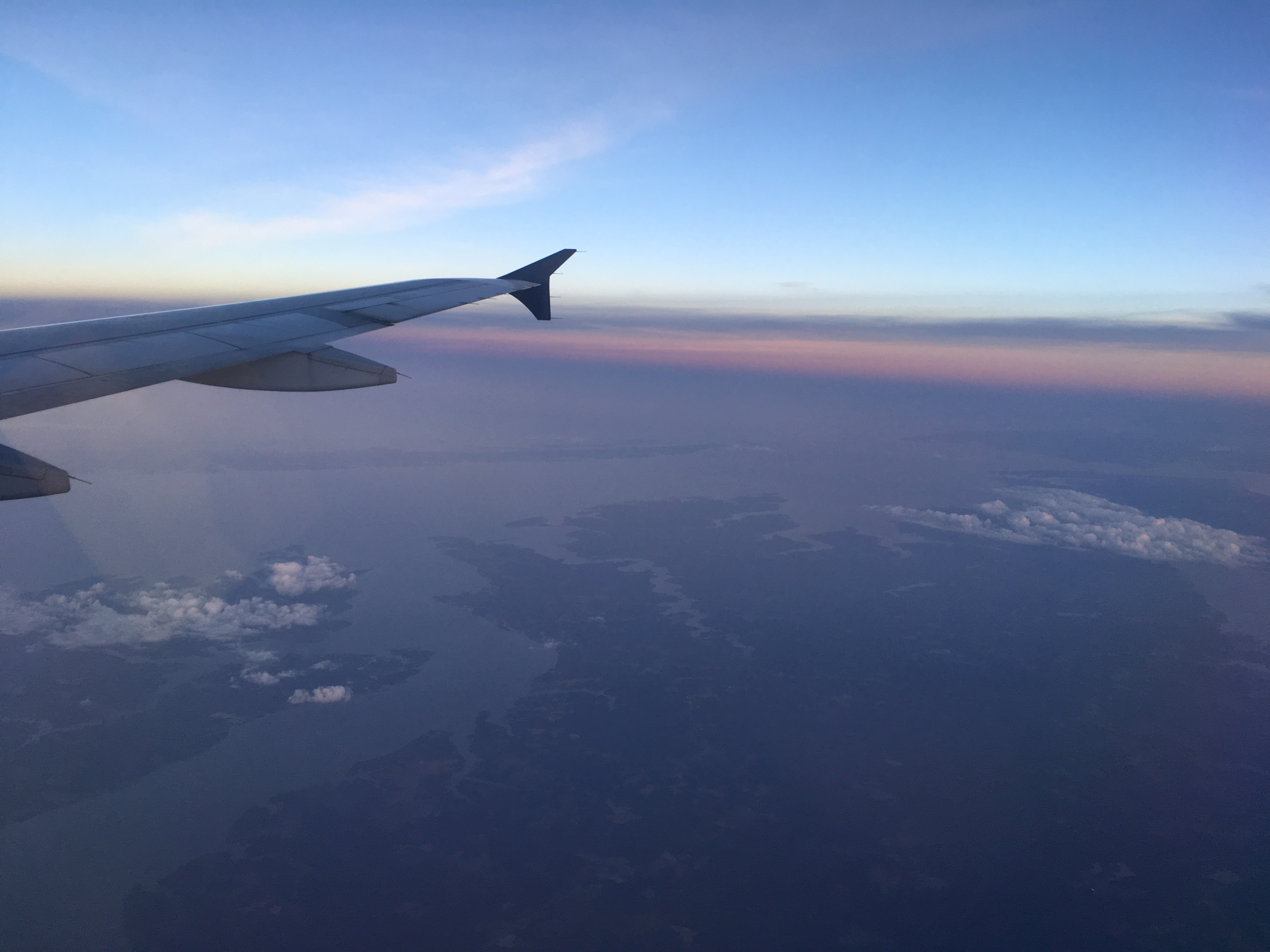
The bay viewed from a plane

== Flora and fauna ==
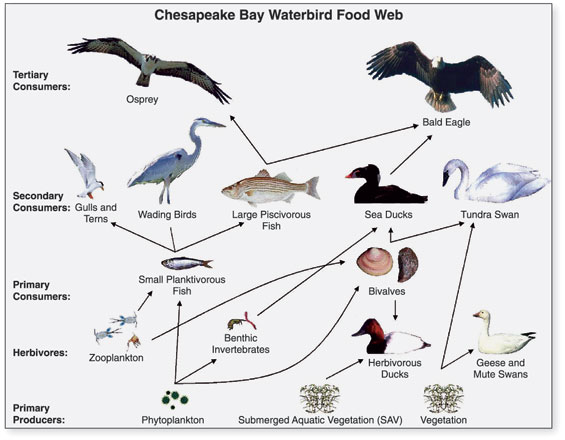
Food chain diagram for waterbirds of the Chesapeake Bay

The Chesapeake Bay is home to numerous fauna that either migrate to the bay at some point during the year or live there year-round. There are over 300 species of fish and numerous shellfish and crab species. Some of these include the Atlantic menhaden, striped bass, American eel, eastern oyster, Atlantic horseshoe crab, and the blue crab.

Birds include ospreys, great blue herons, bald eagles, and peregrine falcons, the last two of which were threatened by DDT; their numbers plummeted but have risen in recent years. The piping plover is a near threatened species that inhabits the wetlands.

Larger fish such as Atlantic sturgeon, varieties of sharks, and stingrays visit the bay. The waters of the Chesapeake Bay have been regarded as one of the most important nursery areas for sharks along the east coast. Megafaunas such as bull sharks, tiger sharks, scalloped hammerhead sharks, and basking sharks and manta rays are also known to visit. Smaller species of sharks and stingrays that are known to be regular to occasional residents in the bay include the smooth dogfish, spiny dogfish, cownose ray, and bonnethead.

Bottlenose dolphins are known to live seasonally/yearly in the bay. There have been unconfirmed sightings of humpback whales in recent years. Endangered North Atlantic right whale, fin, minke, and sei whales have also been sighted within and in the vicinity of the bay.

A male manatee visited the bay several times between 1994 and 2011, even though the area is north of the species' normal range. The manatee, recognizable due to distinct markings on its body, was nicknamed "Chessie" after a legendary sea monster that was allegedly sighted in the bay during the 20th century. The same manatee has been spotted as far north as Rhode Island, and was the first manatee known to travel so far north. Other manatees are occasionally seen in the bay and its tributaries, which contain sea grasses that are part of the manatee's diet.

Loggerhead turtles are known to visit the bay.

The Chesapeake Bay is also home to a diverse flora, both land and aquatic. Common submerged aquatic vegetation includes eelgrass and widgeon grass. A report in 2011 suggested that information on underwater grasses would be released, because "submerged grasses provide food and habitat for a number of species, adding oxygen to the water and improving water clarity." Other vegetation that makes its home in other parts of the bay are wild rice, various trees like the red maple, loblolly pine and bald cypress, and spartina grass and phragmites. Invasive plants have taken a significant foothold in the bay. Plants such as Phragmites, Purple loosestrife and Japanese stiltgrass have established high levels of permanency in Chesapeake wetlands. Additionally, plants such as Brazilian waterweed, native to South America, have spread to most continents with the help of aquarium owners, who often dump the contents of their aquariums into nearby lakes and streams. It is highly invasive and has the potential to flourish in the low-salinity tidal waters of the bay. Dense stands of Brazilian waterweed can restrict water movement, trap sediment and affect water quality. Various local K-12 schools in the Maryland and Virginia region often have programs that cultivate native bay grasses and plant them in the bay.

== History ==
=== Pre-Columbian ===
It is presumed that the Chesapeake Bay was once inhabited by Paleoindians 11,000 years ago. For thousands of years, Native American societies lived in villages of wooden longhouses close to water bodies where they fished and farmed the land. Agricultural products included beans, corn, tobacco, and squash. Villages often lasted between 10 and 20 years before being abandoned due to local resources such as firewood running out or soil depleting. To produce enough food, labor was divided with men hunting while the women supervised the village's farming. All village members took part in the harvesting of fish and shellfish from the local bodies of water. As time went on, communities around the Chesapeake Bay formed confederations such as the Powhatan, the Piscataway, and the Nanticoke. Each of these confederations consisted of a collection of smaller tribes falling under the leadership of a central chief.

=== European exploration and settlement ===
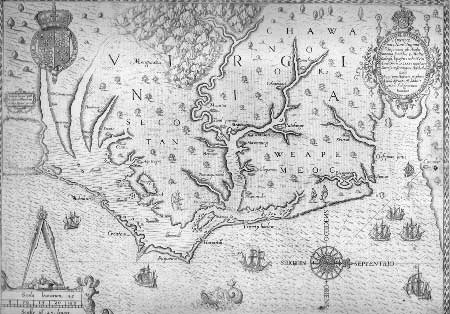
Revised map (Note: orientation of map depicts west at top) of John White's original by Theodore DeBry. In this 1590 version, the Chesapeake Bay appears named for the first time.

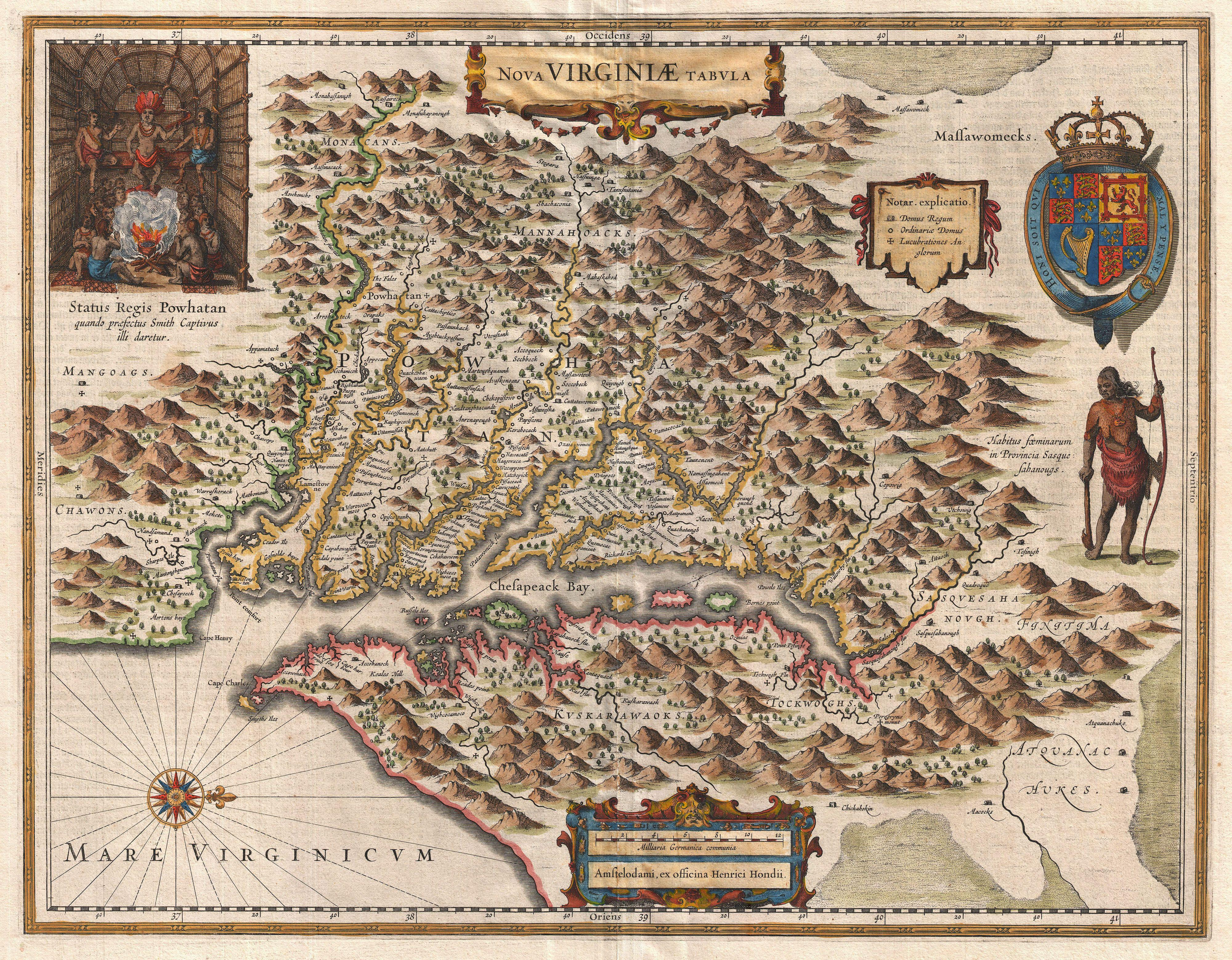
Later (1630) version of the 1612 map by Captain John Smith during his exploration of the Chesapeake. The map is oriented with west at top.

In 1524, Italian explorer Giovanni da Verrazzano, (1485–1528), in service of the French crown, (famous for sailing through and thereafter naming the entrance to New York Bay as the "Verrazzano Narrows", including now in the 20th century, a suspension bridge also named for him) sailed past the Chesapeake During the mid-1520s, Spanish expeditions sponsored by Lucas Vázquez de Ayllón explored portions of the southeastern Atlantic coast of North America. Some historical sources suggest that these voyages may have reached the vicinity of the Chesapeake Bay; however, the extent of their northernmost penetration remains uncertain, and no definitive documentary evidence confirms an entry into the bay. Names such as “Bahía de Santa María” appear in later sources, though their precise geographic attribution is debated. De Ayllón established a short-lived Spanish mission settlement, San Miguel de Gualdape, in 1526 along the Atlantic coast. Many scholars doubt the assertion that it was as far north as the Chesapeake; most place it in present-day Georgia's Sapelo Island. In 1573, Pedro Menéndez de Márquez, the governor of Spanish Florida, conducted further exploration of the Chesapeake. In 1570, Spanish Jesuits established the short-lived Ajacan Mission on one of the Chesapeake tributaries in present-day Virginia.

The arrival of English colonists under Sir Walter Raleigh and Humphrey Gilbert in the late 16th century to found a colony, later settled at Roanoke Island (off the present-day coast of North Carolina) for the Virginia Company, marked the first time that the English approached the gates to the Chesapeake Bay between the capes of Cape Charles and Cape Henry. Three decades later, in 1607, Europeans again entered the bay. Captain John Smith of England explored and mapped the bay between 1607 and 1609, resulting in the publication in 1612 back in the British Isles of "A Map of Virginia". Smith wrote in his journal: "Heaven and earth have never agreed better to frame a place for man's habitation." The Captain John Smith Chesapeake National Historic Trail, the first designated "all-water" National Historic Trail in the US, was established in 2006 by the National Park Service. The trail follows the route of Smith's historic 17th-century voyage. Because of economic hardships and civil strife in the "Mother Land", there was a mass migration of southern English Cavaliers and their servants to the Chesapeake Bay region between 1640 and 1675, to both of the new colonies of the Province of Virginia and the Province of Maryland.

=== American Revolution to the present ===
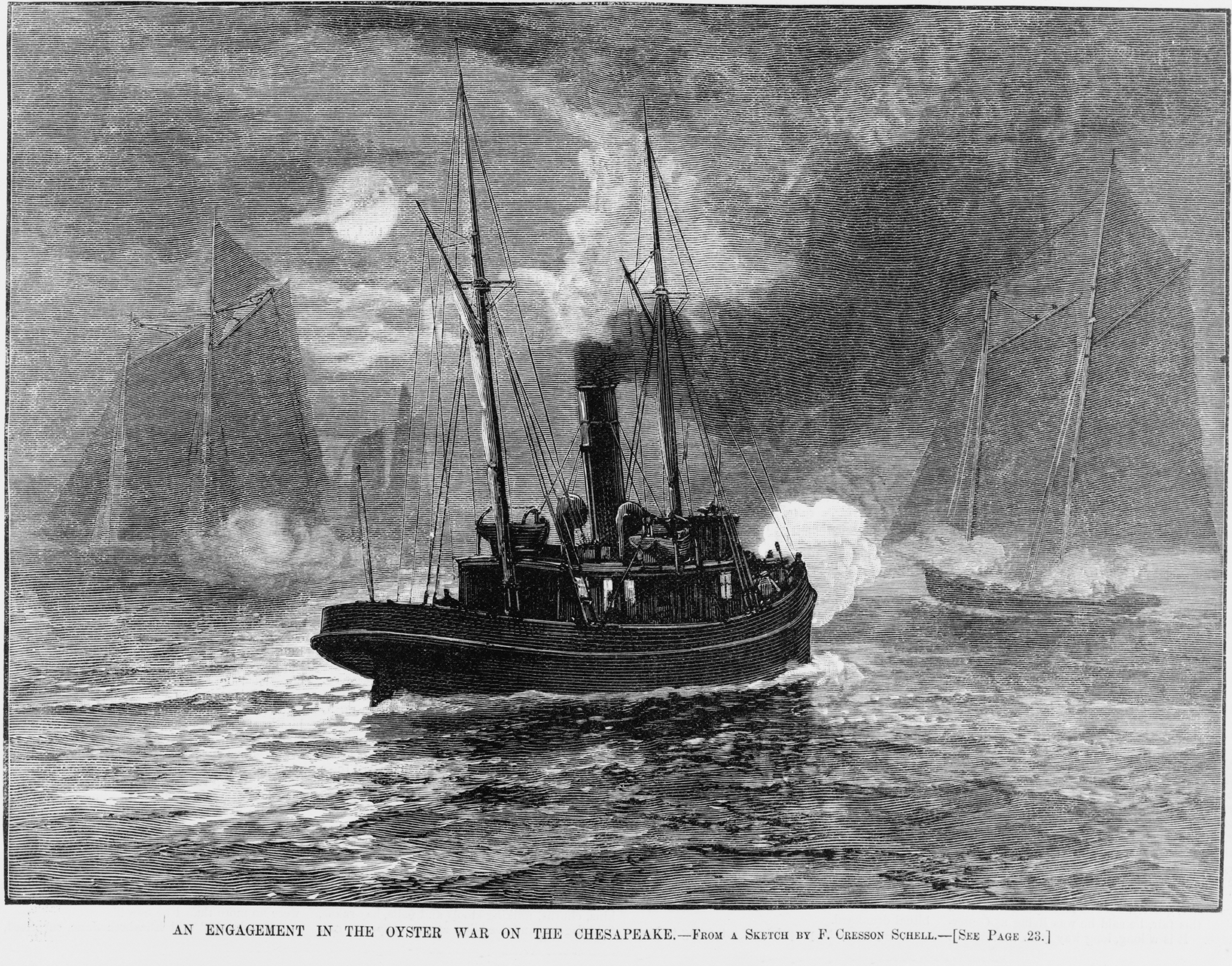
Oyster boats at war off the Maryland shore (1886 wood engraving). Regulation of the oyster beds in Virginia and Maryland has existed since the 19th century.

The Chesapeake Bay was the site of the Battle of the Chesapeake (also known as the "Battle of the Capes", Cape Charles and Cape Henry) in 1781, during which the French fleet defeated the Royal Navy in the decisive naval battle of the American Revolutionary War. The French victory enabled General George Washington and his French allies under the Comte de Rochambeau to march down from New York and bottle up a British army under Lord Cornwallis from the North and South Carolinas at the siege of Battle of Yorktown in Yorktown, Virginia. Their marching route from Newport, Rhode Island through Connecticut, New York State, Pennsylvania, New Jersey and Delaware to the "Head of Elk" by the Susquehanna River along the shores and also partially sailing down the bay to Virginia. It is also the subject of a designated National Historic Trail as the Washington–Rochambeau Revolutionary Route.

The bay would again see conflict during War of 1812. During the year of 1813, from their base on Tangier Island, British naval forces under the command of Admiral George Cockburn raided several towns on the shores of the Chesapeake, treating the bay as if it were a "British Lake". The Chesapeake Bay Flotilla, a fleet of shallow-draft armed barges under the command of U.S. Navy Commodore Joshua Barney, was assembled to stall British shore raids and attacks. After months of harassment by Barney, the British landed on the west side of the Patuxent at Benedict, Maryland, the Chesapeake Flotilla was scuttled, and the British trekked overland to rout the U.S. Army at Bladensburg and burn the U.S. Capitol in August 1814. A few days later in a "pincer attack", they also sailed up the Potomac River to attack Fort Washington below the National Capital and raided the nearby port town of Alexandria, Virginia.

There were so-called "Oyster Wars" in the late 19th and early 20th centuries. Until the mid-20th century, oyster harvesting rivaled the crab industry among Chesapeake watermen, a dwindling breed whose skipjacks and other workboats were supplanted by recreational craft in the latter part of the century.

In the 1960s, the Calvert Cliffs Nuclear Power Plant on the historic Calvert Cliffs in Calvert County on the Western Shore of Maryland began using water from the bay to cool its reactor.

== Navigation ==
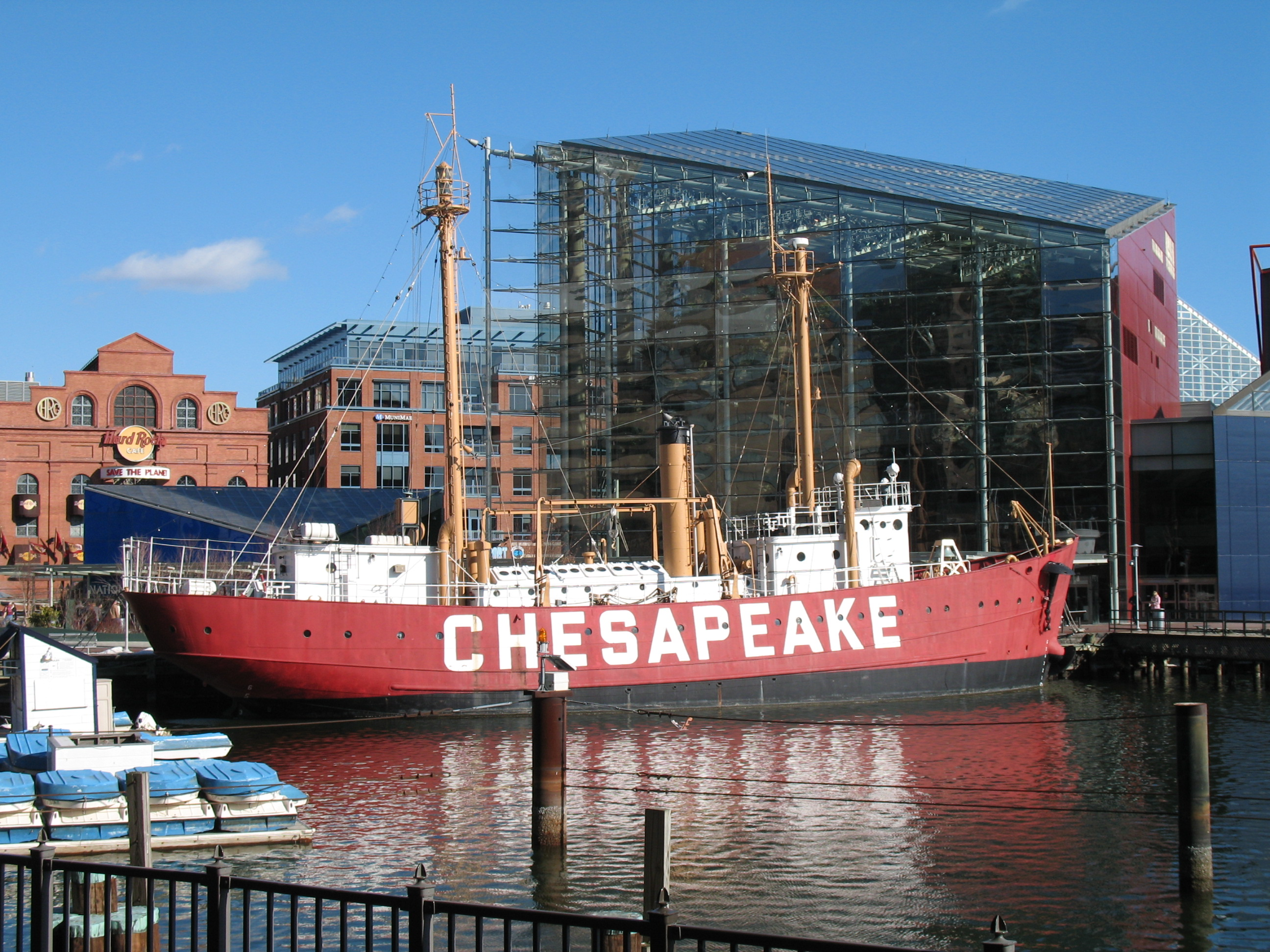
Lighthouses and lightships such as Chesapeake have helped guide ships into the bay.

The Chesapeake Bay forms a link in the Intracoastal Waterway, of the bays, sounds and inlets between the off-shore barrier islands and the coastal mainland along the Atlantic coast connecting the Chesapeake and Delaware Canal (linking the bay to the north and the Delaware River) with the Albemarle and Chesapeake Canal (linking the bay, to the south, via the Elizabeth River, by the cities of Norfolk and Portsmouth to the Albemarle Sound and Pamlico Sound in North Carolina and further to the Sea Islands of Georgia). A busy shipping channel (dredged by the U.S. Army Corps of Engineers since the 1850s) runs the length of the bay, is an important transit route for large vessels entering or leaving the Port of Baltimore, and further north through the Chesapeake and Delaware Canal to the ports of Wilmington and Philadelphia on the Delaware River.

During the later half of the 19th century and the first half of the 20th century, the bay was plied by passenger steamships and packet boat lines connecting the various cities on it, notably the Baltimore Steam Packet Company ("Old Bay Line").

In the later 20th century, a series of road crossings were built. One, the Chesapeake Bay Bridge (also known as the Governor William Preston Lane Jr. Memorial Bridge) between the state capital of Annapolis, Maryland and Matapeake on the Eastern Shore, crossing Kent Island, was constructed 1949–1952. A second, parallel, span was added in 1973. The Chesapeake Bay Bridge–Tunnel, connecting Virginia's Eastern Shore with its mainland (at the metropolitan areas of Virginia Beach, Norfolk, Portsmouth, and Chesapeake), is approximately 20 miles (32 km) long; it has trestle bridges as well as two stretches of two-mile-long (3.2 km) tunnels that allow unimpeded shipping; the bridge is supported by four 5.25-acre (21,200 m^{2}) man-made islands. The Chesapeake Bay Bridge–Tunnel was opened for two lanes in 1964 and four lanes in 1999.

=== Tides ===
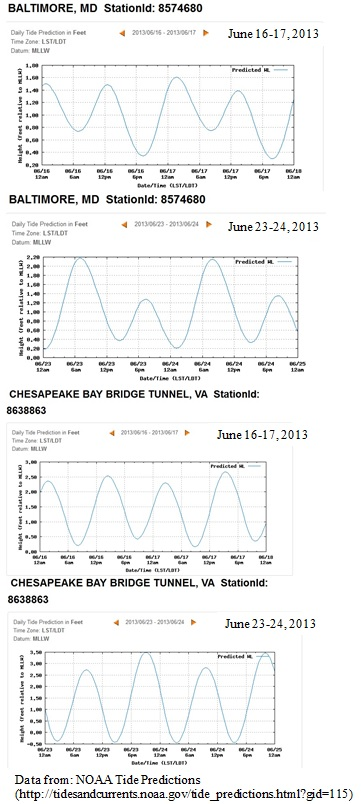
Example Chesapeake Bay tides from Baltimore and the Chesapeake Bay Bridge–Tunnel for quarter and full moons during June 2013

Tides in the Chesapeake Bay exhibit an interesting and unique behavior due to the nature of the topography (both horizontal and vertical shape), wind-driven circulation, and how the bay interacts with oceanic tides. Research into the peculiar behavior of tides both at the northern and southern extents of the bay began in the late 1970s. One study noted sea level fluctuations at periods of 5 days, driven by sea level changes at the bay's mouth on the Atlantic coast and local lateral winds, and 2.5 days, caused by resonant oscillations driven by local longitudinal winds, while another study later found that the geometry of the bay permits for a resonant period of 1.46 days.

A good example of how the different Chesapeake Bay sites experience different tides can be seen in the tidal predictions published by the National Oceanographic and Atmospheric Administration (NOAA)(See figure)

At the Chesapeake Bay Bridge–Tunnel (CBBT) site, which lies at the southernmost point of the bay where it meets the Atlantic Ocean near Norfolk, Virginia, and the capes of Charles and Henry, there is a distinct semi-diurnal tide throughout the lunar month, with small amplitude modulations during spring (new/full moon) vs. neap (one/three quarter moon) tidal periods. The main forcing of the CBBT tides are typical, semi-diurnal ocean tides that the East Coast of the United States experiences.

Baltimore, in the northern portion of the bay, experiences a noticeable modulation to form its mixed tidal nature during spring vs. neap tides. Spring tides, when the sun-earth-moon system forms a line, cause the largest tidal amplitudes during lunar monthly tidal variations. In contrast, neap tides, when the sun-earth-moon system forms a right angle, are muted, and in a semi-diurnal tidal system (such as that seen at the CBBT site) this can be seen as a lowest intertidal range.

Two interesting points that arise from comparing these two sites at opposite ends of the bay are their tidal characteristics – semi-diurnal tide for CBBT and mixed tide for Baltimore (due to resonance in the bay) – and the differences in amplitude (due to dissipation in the bay).

== Economy ==
=== Fishing industry ===
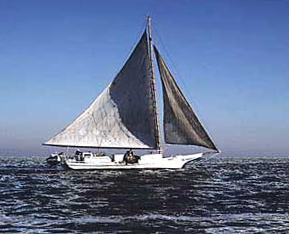
A skipjack, part of the oystering fleet in Maryland

The bay is well known for its seafood, especially blue crabs, clams, and oysters. In the middle of the 20th century, the bay supported 9,000 full-time watermen, according to one account. Today, the body of water is less productive than it used to be because of runoff from urban areas (mostly on the Western Shore) and farms (especially on the Eastern Shore and in the Susquehanna River watershed), over-harvesting, and invasion of foreign species.

The plentiful oyster harvests led to the development of the skipjack (such as the Helen Virginia), the state boat of Maryland, which is the only remaining working boat type in the United States still under sail power. Other characteristic bay-area workboats include sail-powered boats such as the log canoe, the pungy, the bugeye, and the motorized Chesapeake Bay deadrise, the state boat of Virginia.

In addition to harvesting wild oysters, oyster farming is a growing industry in the bay. Oyster aquaculture is passive in that the bay provides all the natural oyster food needed, making it an environmentally friendly practice in contrast to other kinds of fish farming. Oyster farms provide jobs as well as a natural effort for filtering excess nutrients from the water in an effort to reduce the effects of eutrophication pollution (too much algae). The Chesapeake Bay Program promotes oyster restoration projects to reduce the amount of nitrogen compounds entering the bay.

The bay is famous for its rockfish, a regional name for striped bass. Once on the verge of extinction, rockfish have made a significant comeback because of legislative action that put a moratorium on rockfishing, which allowed the species to re-populate. Rockfish can now be fished in strictly controlled and limited quantities.

Other popular recreational fisheries in the Chesapeake Bay include shad, cobia, croaker, and redfish, winter flounder, and summer flounder. Recently, non-native blue catfish have proliferated in tributaries like the James River and may be moving to other areas of the bay. A commercial fishery exists for menhaden, too oily for human consumption but instead used for bait, fish oil, and livestock feed.

=== Tourism and recreation ===
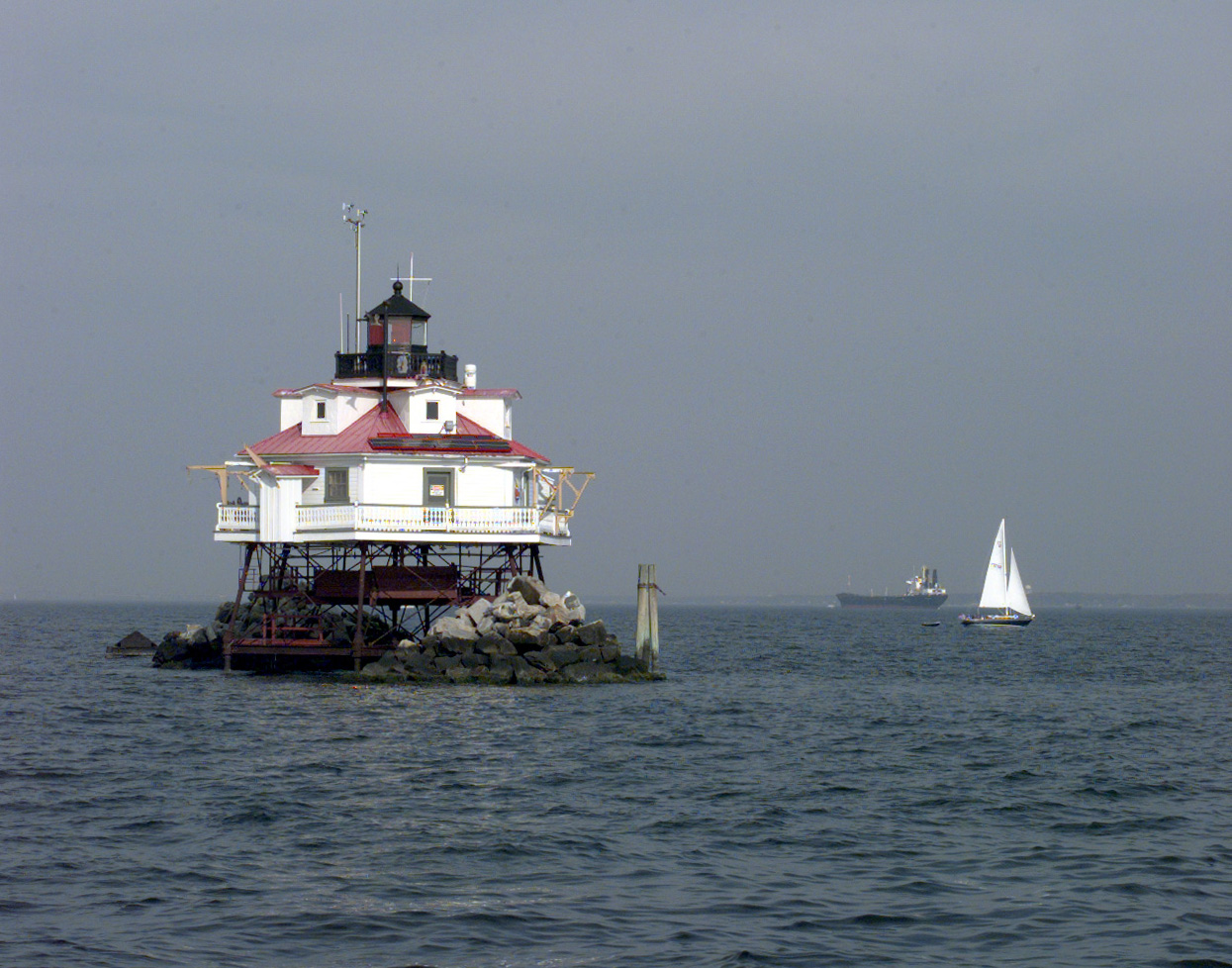
The Thomas Point Shoal Light in Maryland

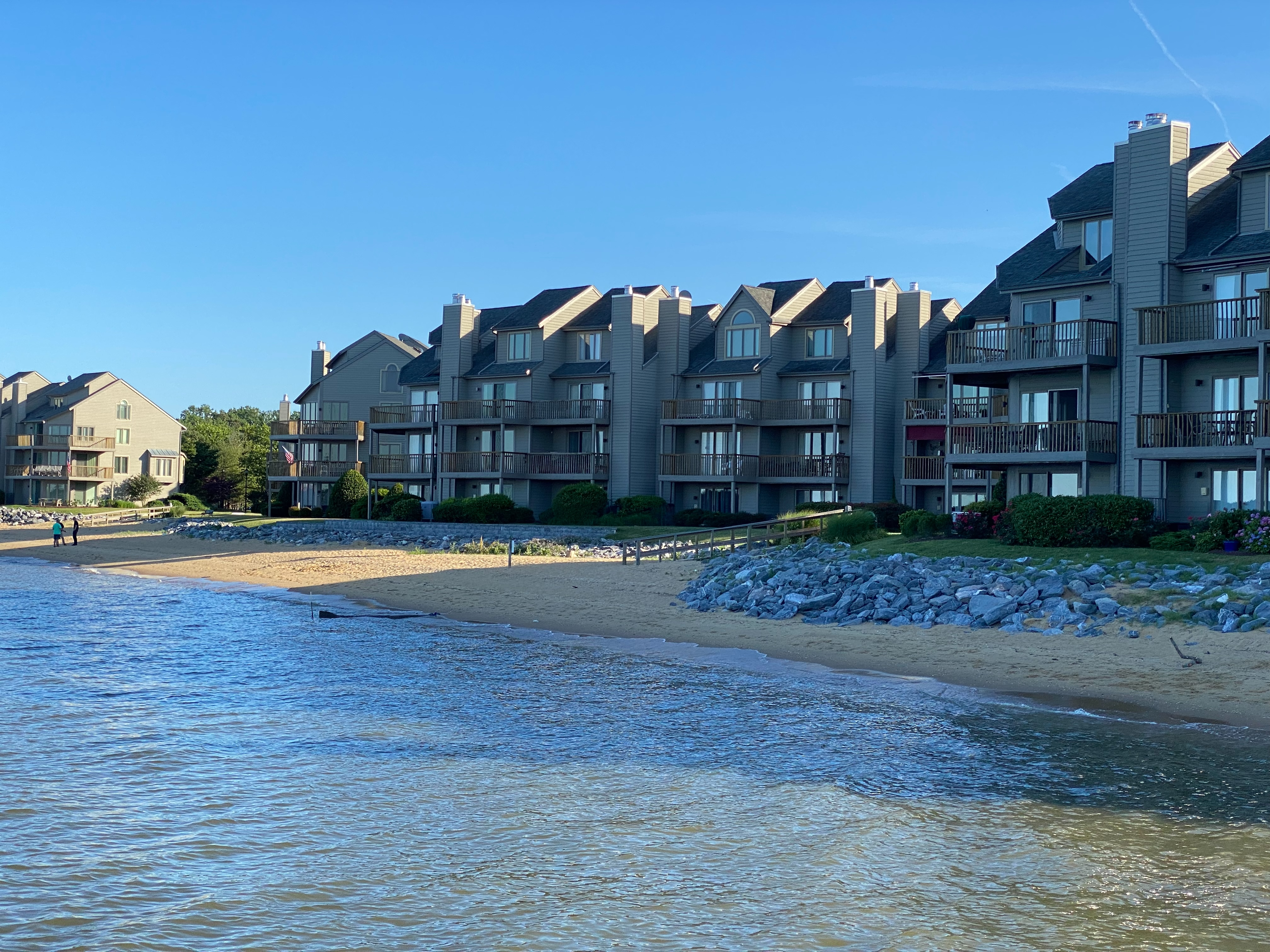
As of 2021, the luxury townhomes on Carr's Beach and Sparrow's Beach.

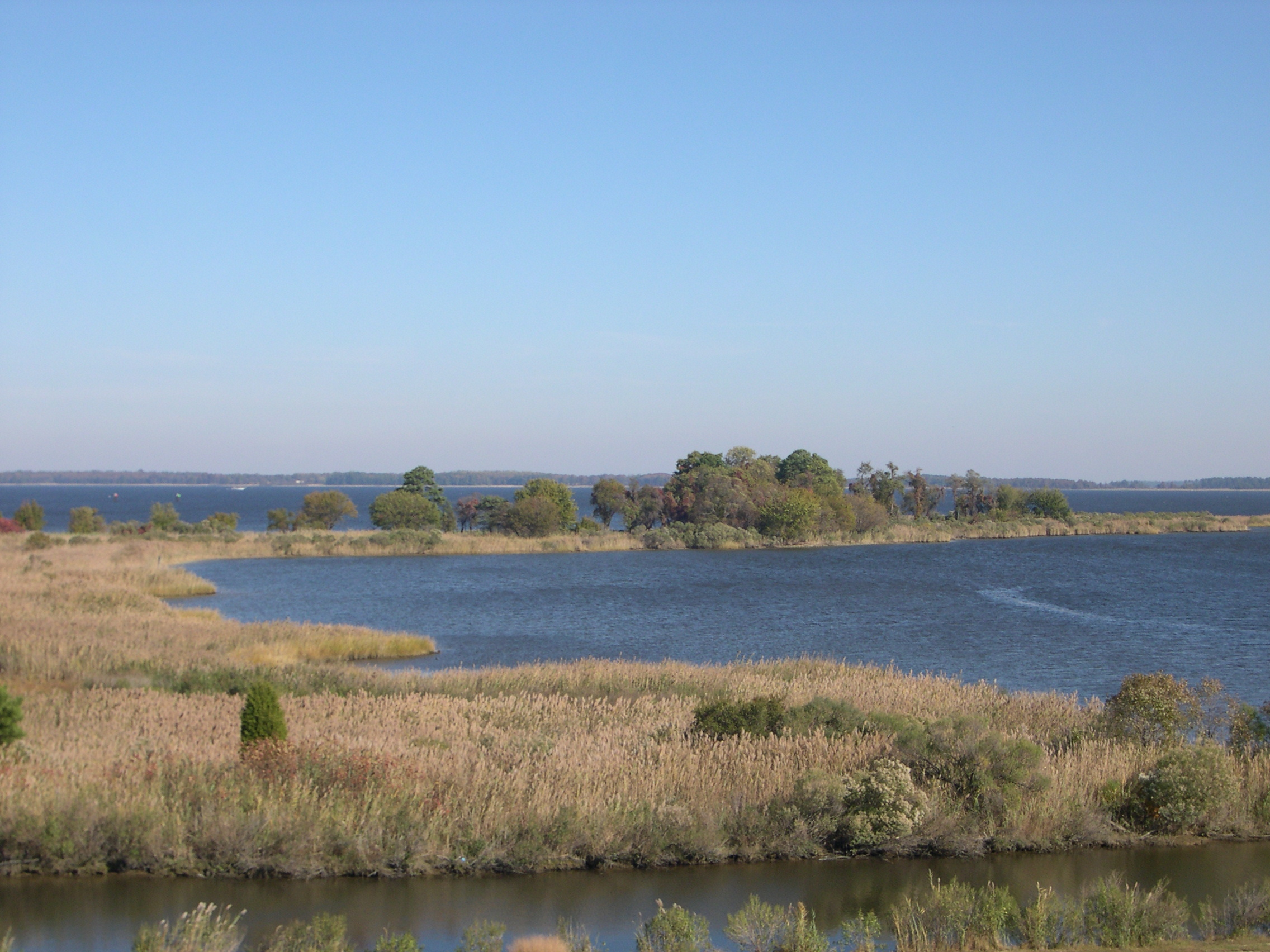
Tidal wetlands of the Chesapeake Bay

The Chesapeake Bay is a main feature for tourists who visit Maryland and Virginia each year. Fishing, crabbing, swimming, boating, kayaking, and sailing are extremely popular activities enjoyed on the waters of the Chesapeake Bay. As a result, tourism has a notable impact on Maryland's economy. One report suggested that Annapolis was an appealing spot for families, water sports and boating. Commentator Terry Smith spoke about the bay's beauty:

The water is glassy, smooth and gorgeous, his wake white against the deep blue. That's the problem with the Chesapeake. It's so damned beautiful.

One account suggested how the Chesapeake attracts people:

You see them everywhere on Maryland's Eastern Shore, the weekend sailors. They are unmistakable with their deep tans, their baggy shorts, their frayed polo shirts, their Top-Siders worn without socks. Some may not even own their own boats, much less win regattas, but they are inexorably drawn to the Chesapeake Bay ... I planned to spend my days boating, eating as many Chesapeake Bay blue crabs as possible and making a little study of Eastern Shore locals. For city folk like me, they're interesting, even exotic –the weather-beaten crabbers and oystermen called "watermen," gentlemen-farmers and sharecroppers, boat builders, antiques dealers – all of whom sound like Southerners with mouthfuls of marbles when they talk. — Susan Spano, Los Angeles Times, 2008

The Chesapeake Bay plays an extremely important role in Maryland, Virginia, and Pennsylvania's economies, in addition to the ecosystem. The nature-based recreation of wildlife, boating, and ecotourism are dependent on enforcement of the Clean Water Act (CWA), which regulates pollutant discharges and supports related pollution control programs. In 2006, "roughly eight million wildlife watchers spent $636 million, $960 million, and $1.4 billion in Maryland, Virginia, and Pennsylvania" according to the Chesapeake Bay Foundation.

== Cuisine ==
In colonial times, simple cooking techniques were used to create one pot meals like ham and potato casserole, clam chowder, or stews with common ingredients like oysters, chicken or venison. When John Smith landed in Chesapeake in 1608, he wrote: "The fish were so thick, we attempted to catch them with frying pans". Common regional ingredients in the local cuisine of Chesapeake included terrapins, smoked hams, blue crab, shellfish, local fish, game meats and various species of waterfowl. Blue crab continues to be an especially popular regional specialty.

== Environmental issues ==
=== Agricultural pollution in the colonial era ===
European settlers around the Chesapeake Bay in the late 17th and early 18th centuries brought with them industrial agricultural techniques. Land clearance and deep plowing of farmland increased sediment and nutrient loading into the bay, which continued to increase as the area continued to develop.

=== Pollution in the 20th century ===
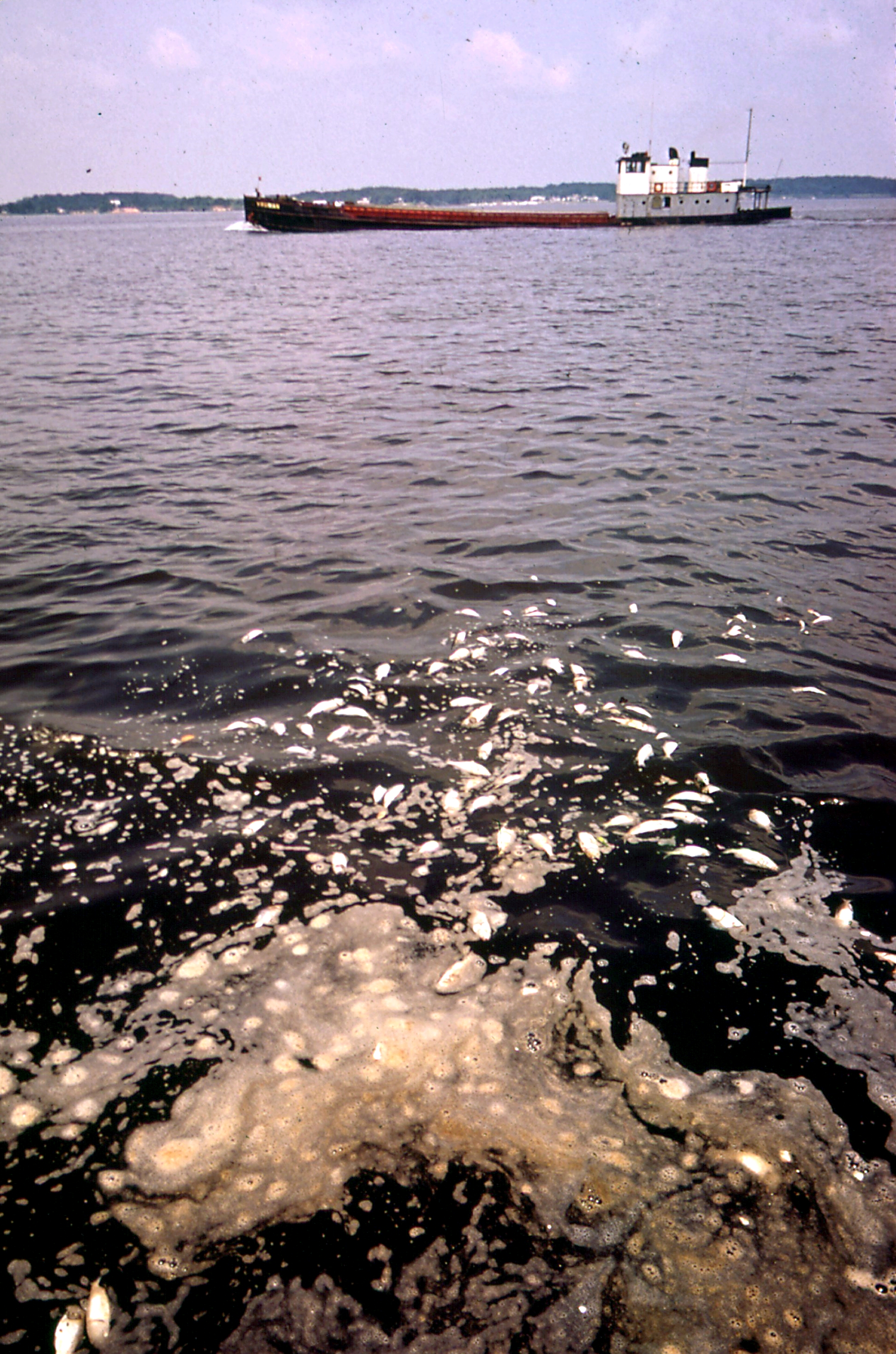
Dead menhaden floating in the bay in 1973

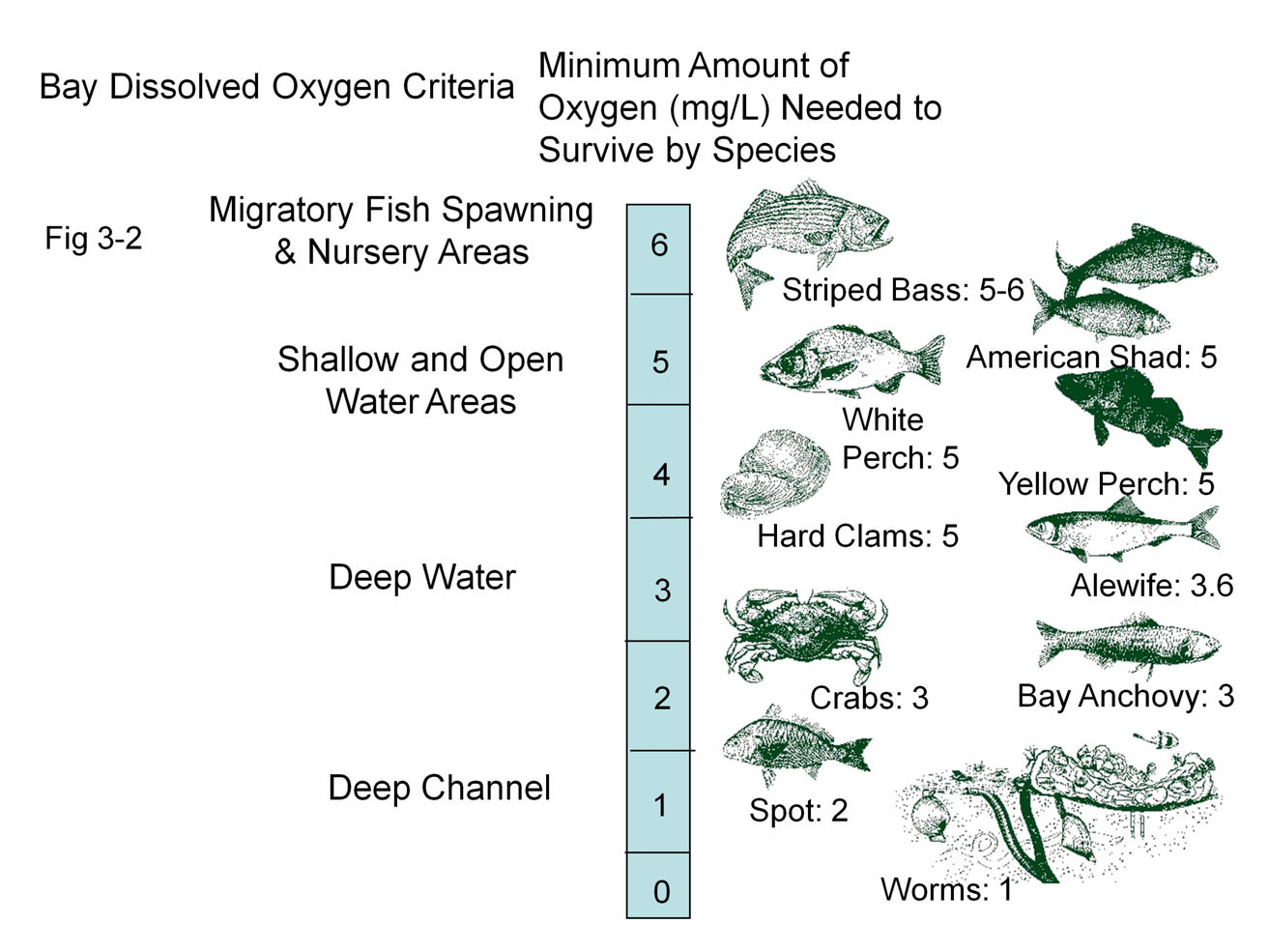
Dissolved oxygen levels (Milligrams per liter) required by various marine animals living in the Chesapeake Bay.

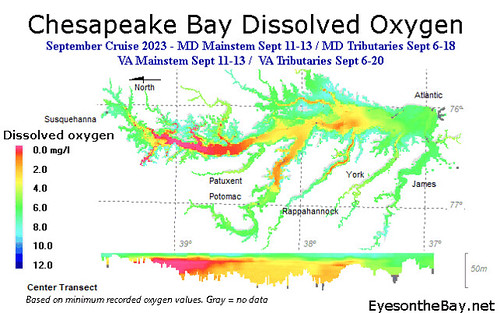
Dissolved oxygen levels, 2023

In the 1970s, the Chesapeake Bay was found to contain one of the planet's first identified marine dead zones, where waters were so depleted of oxygen that they were unable to support life, resulting in massive fish kills. In 2010 the bay's dead zones were estimated to kill 75,000 tons of bottom-dwelling clams and worms each year, weakening the base of the estuary's food chain and robbing the blue crab in particular of a primary food source. Crabs are sometimes observed to amass on shore to escape pockets of oxygen-poor water, a behavior known as a "crab jubilee". Hypoxia results in part from large algal blooms, which are nourished by the runoff of residential, farm and industrial waste throughout the watershed. A 2010 report criticized Amish farmers in Pennsylvania for raising cows with inadequate controls on the manure that they generate. Farms in Lancaster County, Pennsylvania generate large quantities of manure that washes into tributaries of the bay.

The pollution entering the bay has multiple components that contribute to algal blooms, principally the nutrients phosphorus and nitrogen. The algae prevents sunlight from reaching the bottom of the bay while alive and deoxygenates the bay's water when it dies and rots. Soil erosion and runoff of sediment into the bay, exacerbated by devegetation, construction and the prevalence of pavement in urban and suburban areas, also block vital sunlight. The resulting loss of aquatic vegetation has depleted the habitat for much of the bay's animal life. Beds of eelgrass, the dominant variety in the southern Chesapeake Bay, have shrunk by more than half there since the early 1970s. Overharvesting, pollution, sedimentation and disease have turned much of the bay's bottom into a muddy wasteland.

The principal sources of nutrient pollution in the bay are surface runoff from farms, as well as runoff from urban and suburban areas. About half of the nutrient pollutant loads in the bay are generated by manure and poultry litter. Extensive use of lawn fertilizers and air pollution from motor vehicles and power plants are also significant nutrient sources.

The sediment record of the bay shows a major increase in nutrient levels, suggesting limited availability of oxygen, starting between the 17th and 18th centuries. (Zimmerman & Canuel, 2002) The overloading of nutrients into the bay only continued to increase throughout the modern era. Recently deposited sediments in the bay have 2 to 3 times greater amounts of organic carbon, and 4 to 20 times greater amounts of nitrogen and phosphorus input into the bay than the pre-colonial era (Cornwell et al., 1996; Fisher et al., 2006).

The nutrient runoff from land sources causes a huge increase in available nutrients in the water. Algae present in the bay take up those nutrients and rapidly reproduce in algal blooms. As algae sink to the bottom, they are decomposed, consuming oxygen (Long et al. 2014). Seasonal stratification in the bay typically occurs between Spring and early Fall (Officer et al. 1984; Cerco & Noel 2007). More sunlight, higher temperatures, and less storms and winds during the summer cause strongly stratified water column, with a pycnocline typically 10 meters below the surface (Cerco & Noel; Seliger et al.). As oxygen is depleted from the decomposition of organic matter in bottom waters, but is not able to exchange gas with surface water due to a strong pycnocline, dissolved oxygen levels reach near zero by mid-June and can persist until October (Officer et al.). Organisms living in bottom waters may have some tolerance to hypoxia, but when events exceed their tolerance, ecologically and commercially important crabs, oysters, and mesoplankton become unhealthy and may experience die offs (Kirby & Miller; Officer; Kimmel).

One particularly harmful source of toxicity is Pfiesteria piscicida, which can affect both fish and humans. Pfiesteria caused a small regional panic in the late 1990s when a series of large blooms started killing large numbers of fish while giving swimmers mysterious rashes; nutrient runoff from chicken farms was blamed for the growth.

=== Sewage overflows and treatment plant upsets ===
Sanitary sewers and some sewage treatment plants in the Chesapeake Bay region have occasionally contributed significant pollution to the bay. Although the region's treatment plants are designed to meet state and federal standards, the Baltimore city sewage collection system experiences sanitary sewer overflows (SSOs) during large rainstorms, which can cause excessive pollutant discharges into the bay. In 2021, 11% of nitrogen and 15% of phosphorus levels in the Chesapeake Bay were traced from sewage plants. In 2024, a heavy rainfall led to the overflow of 14 million gallons of sewage discharged by the Back River Wastewater Treatment Plant. The sewage leaked into local Baltimore waterways and the bay, leading to an amount of sewage overflow expected in one year to be released in one day. The city has also had difficulty in providing regular adequate maintenance at the Back River plant, which can lead to spills and leaks.

The Patapsco and Back River plants, the two largest treatment plants in Maryland, have contributed to the growth of phragmite plants in biological cleaning tanks, which are used for cleaning returning water of nitrogen and phosphorus. In 2021 the city completed its "Headworks Project" at the Back River plant which provides additional underground storage of wastewater, to address the SSO problems, at a cost of $124 million. In April 2025 the Maryland Department of the Environment announced that it had awarded grants to make further improvements to the Baltimore treatment plants, and to install a trash interceptor on the Back River.

Washington, D.C., similar to Baltimore and many older U.S. cities, operates a combined sewer system. The oldest portions of the sewage collection system were built in the late 19th and early 20th centuries, and cover about one-third of the city's service area. During large rain storms, the collection system may be overloaded, leading to combined sewer overflows (CSOs) and discharges of untreated sewage into the Potomac River, Anacostia River and Rock Creek. To address the city's CSO problems, in 2013 DC Water began building large stormwater storage facilities as part of its "Clean Rivers" project. As of 2025 portions of the storage tunnel system are in operation. When the $2.99 billion project concludes in 2030 the system improvements, which include construction of 18 miles (29 km) of tunnels, as well as green infrastructure projects, are expected to reduce CSO discharges by 96%.

=== Depletion of oysters ===
While the bay's salinity is ideal for oysters and the oyster fishery was at one time the bay's most commercially viable, the population has in the last fifty years been devastated. Maryland once had roughly 200,000 acres (810 km^{2}) of oyster reefs. In 2008 there were about 36,000 acres (150 km^{2}). It has been estimated that in pre-colonial times, oysters could filter the entirety of the bay in about 3.3 days; by 1988 this time had increased to 325 days. The harvest's gross value decreased 88% from 1982 to 2007. One report suggested the bay had fewer oysters in 2008 than 25 years earlier. The primary problem is overharvesting. Lax government regulations allow anyone with a license to remove oysters from state-owned beds, and although limits are set, they are not strongly enforced. The overharvesting of oysters has made it difficult for them to reproduce, which requires close proximity to one another. A second cause for the oyster depletion is that the drastic increase in human population caused a sharp increase in pollution flowing into the bay. The bay's oyster industry has also suffered from two diseases: MSX and Dermo.

The depletion of oysters has had a particularly harmful effect on the quality of the bay. Oysters serve as natural water filters, and their decline has further reduced the water quality of the bay. Water that was once clear for meters is now so turbid that a wader may lose sight of his feet while his knees are still dry.

=== Institutional responses to pollution problems ===
Concern about the increasing discoveries of bay pollution problems, and of the institutional challenges of organizing bay restoration programs over a large geographical area, led to Congress directing the US Environmental Protection Agency (EPA) to take a greater role in studying the scientific and technical aspects of the problems beginning in the late 1970s. The agency conducted its research over a seven-year period and published a major report in 1983. The report stated that the bay was an "ecosystem in decline" and cited numerous instances of declines in the populations of oysters, crabs, freshwater fish and other wildlife.

The growing concerns about pollution also prompted the legislatures of Maryland and Virginia to establish the Chesapeake Bay Commission, an advisory body, in 1980. The commission consults with the state legislatures and executive agencies, as well as Congress, about environmental, economic and social issues related to the bay.

As an initial follow-up to the EPA report, the Chesapeake Bay Commission and EPA developed the Chesapeake Bay Agreement in 1983. The agreement was signed by the governors of Maryland, Virginia and Pennsylvania; the Mayor of the District of Columbia; and the EPA Administrator. The parties agreed to:

- Creation of an "Executive Council" consisting of cabinet-level appointees from each state and Washington, D.C., and the EPA Regional Administrator
- The council's creation of an implementation committee to coordinate technical issues and development management plans for bay restoration
- The establishment of the Chesapeake Bay Program as a liaison office for all of the participating organizations. The program's office, based in Annapolis, is partially funded by EPA and staffed by experts from the member states, EPA and other federal agencies, and academic institutions.

Concurrent with the 1983 agreement EPA began providing matching grants to the bay states for research and restoration projects.

In 1987 the parties agreed to set a goal of reducing the amount of nutrients that enter the bay by 40 percent by 2000. In 1992, the bay program partners agreed to continue the 40 percent reduction goal beyond 2000 and to attack nutrients at their source: upstream, in the bay tributaries.

In response to the decline of the oyster population, for decades the Maryland Department of Natural Resources (MDNR) has restricted the amount of oyster harvesting in the bay, and designated certain areas as off-limits to harvesting. As of 2025 MDNR continues to regulate oyster harvesting by limiting the amount of oysters harvested per day, and limiting the number of harvest days per week.

=== Restoration efforts ===
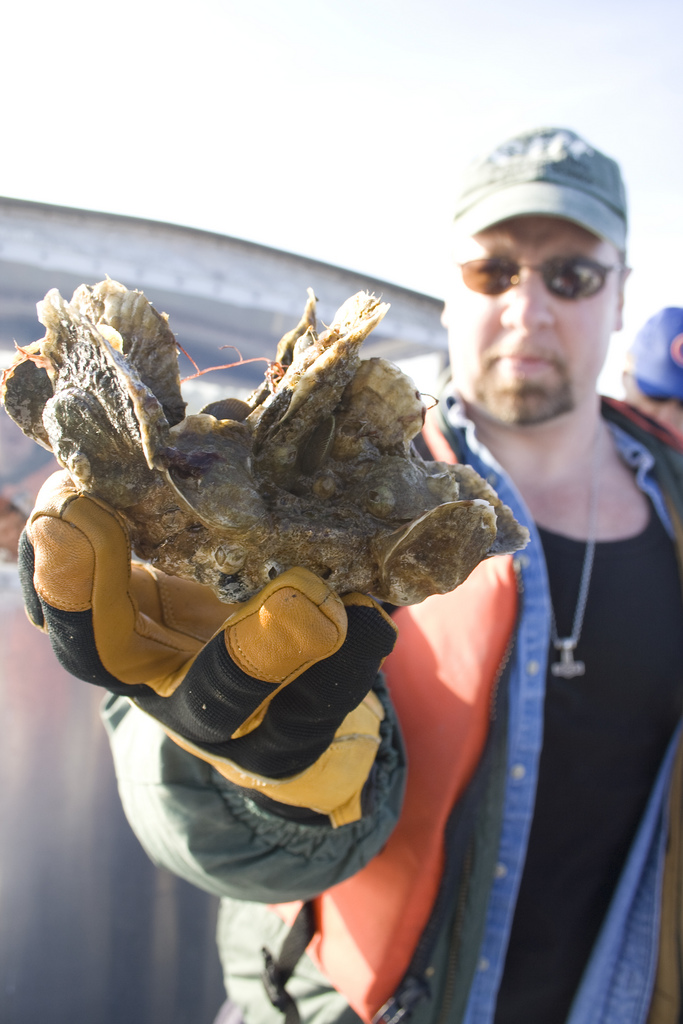
A cluster of oysters grown in a sanctuary

Efforts of federal, state and local governments, working in partnership through the Chesapeake Bay Program along with the Chesapeake Bay Foundation and other nonprofit environmental groups, to restore or at least maintain the current water quality, have had mixed results. One particular obstacle to cleaning up the bay is that much of the polluting substances are discharged far upstream in states far removed from the bay: New York and Pennsylvania. Despite the State of Maryland spending over $100 million to restore the bay, conditions have continued to grow worse. In the mid-20th century, the bay supported over 6,000 oystermen. As of 2008, there were fewer than 500.

In June 2000, the Chesapeake Bay Program adopted Chesapeake 2000, an agreement adopted by the member jurisdictions, intended to guide restoration activities throughout the Chesapeake Bay watershed through 2010. One component of this agreement was a series of upgrades to sewage treatment plants throughout the watershed. In 2016 EPA stated that the upgrades "have resulted in steep reductions in nitrogen and phosphorus pollution... despite increases in human population and wastewater volume."

EPA published a series of scientific documents on water quality criteria for the bay between 2004 and 2010. The criteria documents, which describe specific pollutants and their effects on aquatic species, are used by the states to develop water quality standards (WQS) for individual water bodies. Delaware, Maryland, Virginia, and the District of Columbia adopted WQS for various Chesapeake Bay tributaries in the mid-2000s, referencing the EPA criteria documents, as well as their own extensive data gathering and modeling efforts.

Restoration efforts that began in the 1990s have continued into the 21st century and show potential for growth of the native oyster population. Efforts to repopulate the bay using oyster hatcheries have been carried out by a group called the Oyster Recovery Partnership, with some success. In 2011 the group placed 6 million oysters on eight acres (32,000 m^{2}) of the Trent Hall sanctuary. Scientists from the Virginia Institute of Marine Science at the College of William & Mary claim that experimental reefs created in 2004 now house 180 million native oysters, Crassostrea virginica, which is far fewer than the billions that once existed.

Dams on bay tributaries have blocked passages for migratory fish. Removing such blockages was one of the goals identified in the 2014 bay watershed agreement. During 2022-2023, 13 dams were removed, yielding a total of 303 miles (488 km) of tributaries opened to restore fish migration. Since 1989, the cumulative total of fish migration route restorations in the tributaries is 35,258 miles (56,742 km).

=== Regulatory actions ===
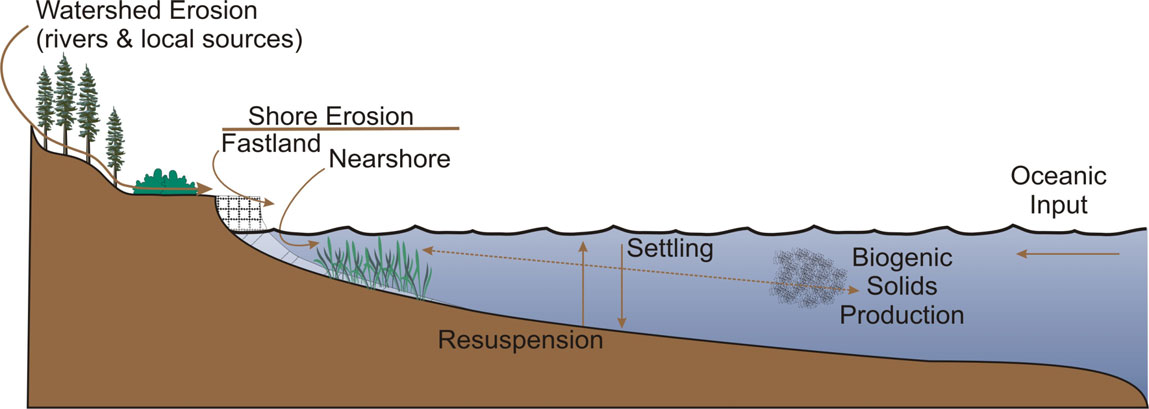
Sediment sources in the Chesapeake Bay

In 2009 the Chesapeake Bay Foundation (CBF) filed suit against EPA for its failure to finalize a total maximum daily load (TMDL) ruling for the bay, pursuant to the Clean Water Act. The TMDL would restrict water pollution from farms, land development, power plants and sewage treatment plants. EPA, which had been working with the states on various components of the TMDL since the 1980s (e.g. water quality criteria, standards for individual tributaries, improvements in data gathering and modeling techniques), agreed to settle the lawsuit and issued its TMDL for nitrogen, phosphorus and sediment pollution on December 29, 2010. This was the largest, most complex TMDL document that EPA had issued to date. The TMDL was challenged in litigation by the agriculture and construction industries, but EPA's document was upheld by the courts.

In 2020 the CBF filed another lawsuit against EPA for its failure to require the states of New York and Pennsylvania to comply with their TMDL goals and reduce pollution in the bay. CBF and EPA reached a settlement on the lawsuit in 2023. EPA agreed to increase its efforts to reduce farm and stormwater runoff pollution in Pennsylvania, including compliance and enforcement actions.

EPA's 2010 TMDL document requires all states in the bay watershed region to develop detailed implementation plans for pollutant reduction. The states have been developing their plans for years, in many cases building upon restoration projects that they had initiated before EPA's TMDL was finalized. These plans are long and complex, involving regular consultation with many stakeholders (i.e. governments, industry, agriculture, citizen groups). The plans include multiple milestone goals for project initiation or continued progress in water quality, through the use of pollution control upgrades (such as at sewage treatment plants) and more widespread utilization of various best management practices (BMPs). The BMPs are designed for specific sites to control pollution from nonpoint sources, principally agriculture, land development and urban runoff. For example, a farmer may install vegetated stream buffers along a stream bank to reduce runoff of sediment, nutrients and other pollutants. A land developer may install stormwater management facilities such as infiltration basins or constructed wetlands during the construction of housing or commercial buildings.

In 2011 both Maryland and Virginia enacted laws to reduce the effects of lawn fertilizer use, by restricting nitrogen and phosphorus content. The Virginia law also banned deicers containing urea, nitrogen or phosphorus.

Installation of stormwater management facilities is already a requirement for most new construction projects in the bay region, under various state and local government requirements. These facilities reduce erosion and keep sediment and other pollutants from entering tributaries and the bay. However retrofitting such facilities into existing developed areas is often expensive due to high land costs, or difficult to install among existing structures. As a result, the extent of such retrofit projects in the bay region has been limited.

In May 2025 Governor Wes Moore signed the Chesapeake Bay Legacy Act which allots up to $900,000 per year to a new certification program for farmers who use sustainable practices that decrease runoff into the bay, establishes a water quality monitoring program to unify current testing efforts and aims to streamline oyster aquaculture leasing, among other provisions.

=== Water quality improvements ===
In 2010 bay health improved slightly in terms of the overall health of its ecosystem, earning a rating of 31 out of 100, up from a 28 rating in 2008. An estimate in 2006 from a "blue ribbon panel" said cleanup costs would be $15 billion. Compounding the problem is that 100,000 new residents move to the area each year. A 2008 Washington Post report suggested that government administrators had overstated progress on cleanup efforts as a way to "preserve the flow of federal and state money to the project." In January 2011, there were reports that millions of fish had died, but officials suggested it was probably the result of extremely cold weather.

The health of the Chesapeake Bay improved in 2015, marking three years of gains over a four-year period, according to a 2016 report by the University of Maryland Center for Environmental Science (UMCES). In 2021 scientists at the UMCES reported slight improvements in bay water quality compared to levels measured in 2020. The greatest improvements were seen in the lower bay areas, while the Patapsco River and Back River (Maryland) regions showed minimal improvement. Positive indicators included decreased nitrogen levels and increases in dissolved oxygen.

The CBF reported that as of 2022 pollution control efforts in the bay have continued to show mixed results, with no improvement in levels of toxic contaminants, nitrogen and dissolved oxygen, and a small decrease in water clarity compared to 2020 levels (measured as Secchi depth). Oyster and rockfish populations in the bay have improved, but blue crab populations have continued to decline.

In the 2023 annual report the University of Maryland Center for Environmental Science rated the Chesapeake Bay's overall health a C-plus or 55%, its highest score since 2002. The following year the overall bay score fell to a C, while the watershed scored a C-plus.

=== Climate change ===
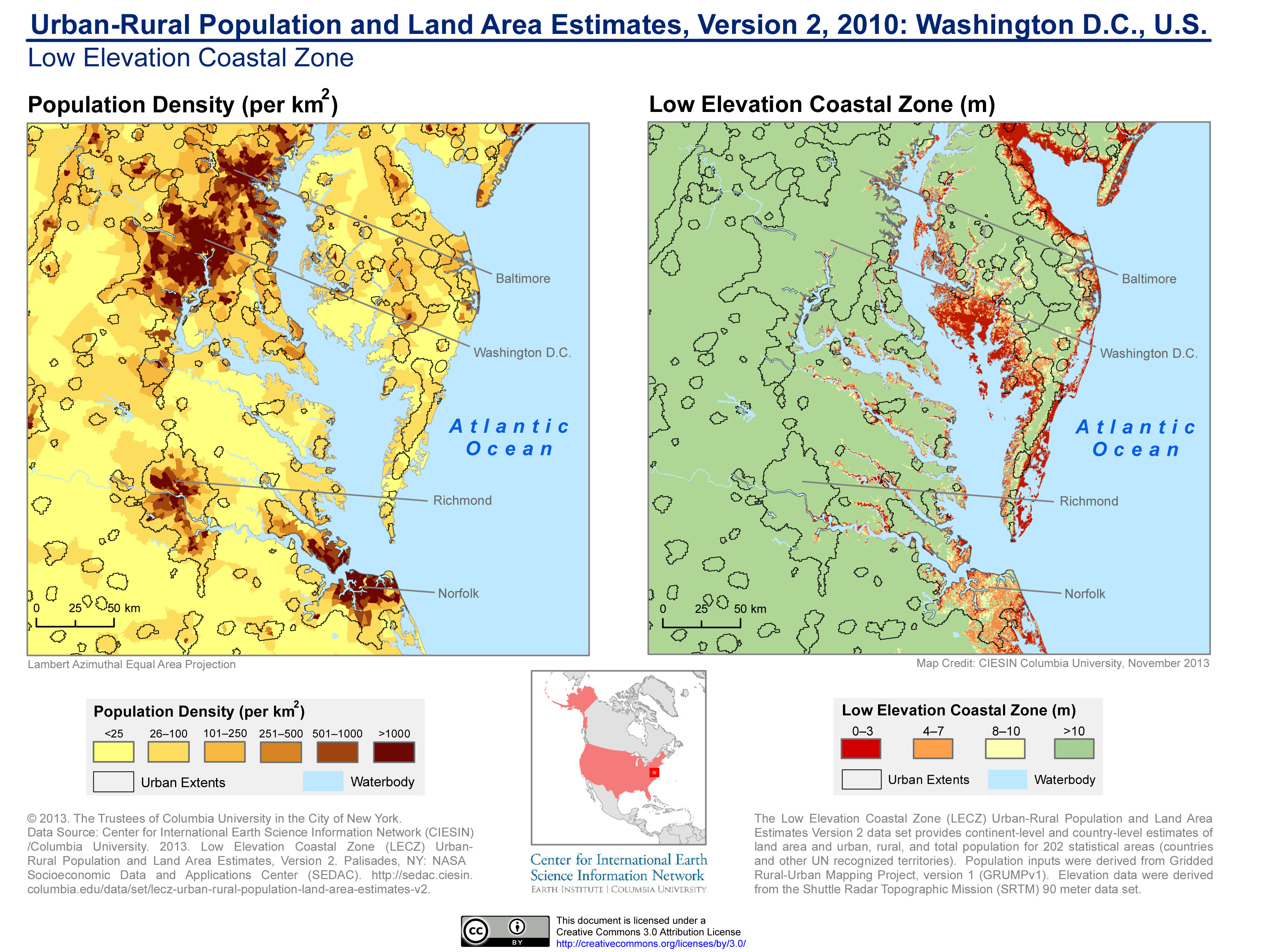
Population density and elevation above sea level around the Chesapeake Bay. The Chesapeake Bay is especially vulnerable to sea level rise.

The Chesapeake Bay is already experiencing the effects of climate change. Key among these is sea level rise: water levels in the bay have already risen one foot, with a predicted increase of 1.3 to 5.2 feet in the next 100 years. This has related environmental effects, causing changes in marine ecosystems, destruction of coastal marshes and wetlands, and intrusion of saltwater into otherwise brackish parts of the bay. Sea level rise also compounds the effects of extreme weather on the bay, making coastal flooding as part of the events more extreme and increasing runoff from upstream in the watershed.

With increases in flooding events and sea level rise, the 11,600 miles of coastline, which include significant historic buildings and modern infrastructure, will be at risk of erosion. Islands such as Holland Island have disappeared due to the rising sea levels.

Beyond sea level rise, other changes in the marine ecosystem due to climate change, such as ocean acidification and temperature increases, will put increasing pressure on marine life. Projected effects include decreasing dissolved oxygen, more acidic waters making it harder for shellfish to maintain shells and changing the seasonal cycles important for breeding and other lifecycle activities. Seasonal shifts and warmer temperatures also mean that there is a greater likelihood of pathogens to stay active in the ecosystem.

Climate change may worsen hypoxia. However, compared to the current effects of nutrient pollution and algal blooms, climate change's effect to increase hypoxia is relatively small. Warmer waters can hold less dissolved oxygen. Therefore, as the bay warms, there may be a longer duration of hypoxia each summer season in the deep central channel of the bay. However, comparing the effects of climate change and nutrient pollution, reduced nutrient pollution would increase oxygen concentrations more dramatically than if climate change were to level out.

Climate change adaptation and mitigation programs in Maryland and Virginia often include significant programs to address the communities in the Chesapeake Bay. Key infrastructure in Virginia, such as the port of Norfolk, and major agriculture and fishing industries of the Eastern Shore of Maryland will be directly impacted by the changes in the bay.

=== Scientific research ===
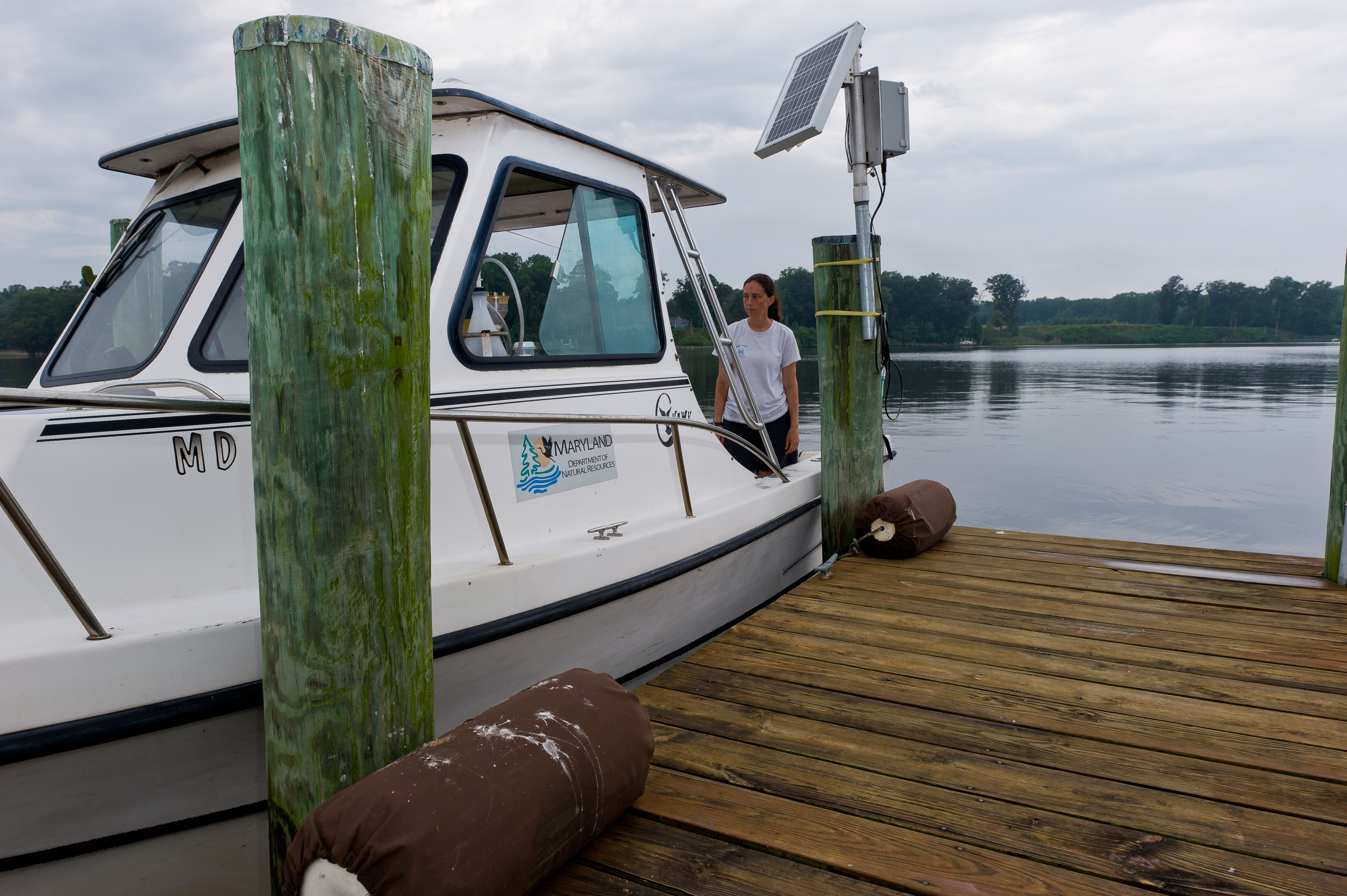
Maryland Department of Natural Resources survey vessel tied up to a private dock with a continuous monitoring station.

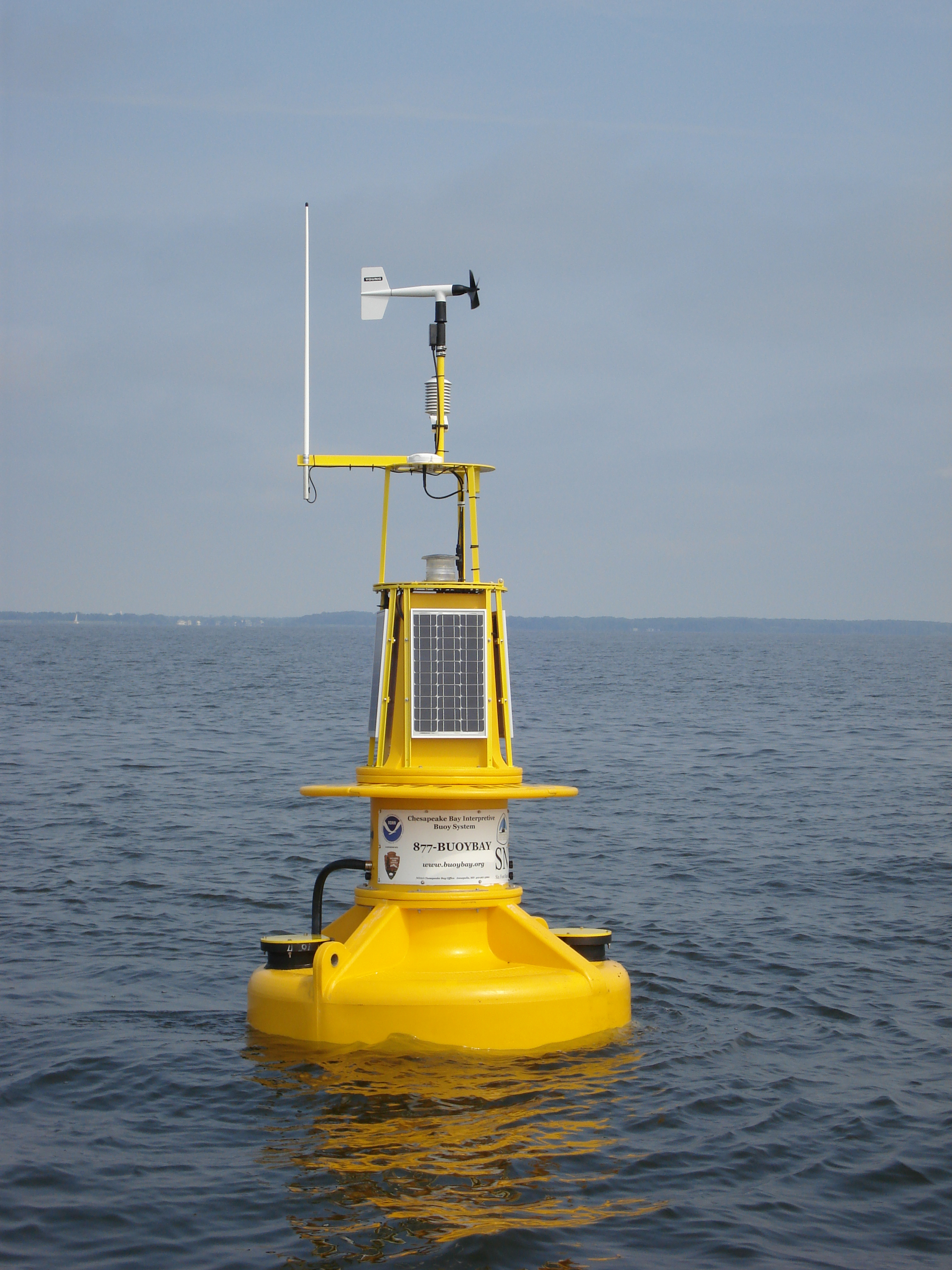
Chesapeake Bay Interpretive Buoy System smart buoy on the Patapsco River.

Researchers work in the Chesapeake Bay to collect information about water quality, plant and animal abundances, shoreline erosion, tides, waves, and harmful algal blooms. For example, the Virginia Institute of Marine Science monitors the abundance of submerged aquatic vegetation in the shallow areas of the Chesapeake Bay each summer. Many organizations run continuous monitoring programs. Monitoring programs set out instruments at fixed stations on buoys, moorings, and docks throughout the bay to record things like temperature, salinity, chlorophyll-a concentration, dissolved oxygen, and turbidity over time.

Organizations actively collecting data in the Chesapeake Bay include, but are not limited to:

- Chesapeake Bay National Estuarine Research Reserve in Maryland
- Chesapeake Bay National Estuarine Research Reserve in Virginia
- Chesapeake Bay Program
- Hampton Roads Sanitation District
- Maryland Department of Natural Resources
- Goddard Space Flight Center (GSFC), Ocean Biology group
- GSFC Applied Sciences group (Water Resources and Human Health areas)
- NOAA Chesapeake Bay Office
- Old Dominion University's Earth and Ocean Sciences Department
- Smithsonian Environmental Research Center
- United States Geological Survey
- University of Maryland Center for Environmental Science
- Virginia Department of Environmental Quality
- Virginia Department of Health
- Virginia Institute of Marine Science
- Virginia Marine Resources Commission

== Underwater archaeology ==
In 1988, the Maryland Maritime Archeology Program (MMAP) was established to manage and explore various underwater archaeological. This was in response to the National Abandoned Shipwreck Act passed in 1987, which gave ownership of historically significant shipwrecks to those states with proper management programs.

=== Location and research processes ===
The Chesapeake Bay watershed has been heavily impacted by natural forces such as erosion, tides, and a history of hurricanes and other storms. Along with environmental factors, the bay has been negatively impacted by humans since being settled in the 17th century, bringing with them problems like pollution, construction, destruction of the environment, and, currently, poultry farms. All of these circumstances have made it increasingly difficult for the MMAP to identify potential underwater archaeological sites. As sea levels rise and historically significant areas are sunk and covered in sediment, the MMAP relies on various pieces of equipment to locate these man-made anomalies but also ensure that the material being examined is kept intact. Using marine magnetometers (detects iron/absent space), side-scan sonar (detects objects on sea floor), along with precise global positioning systems, Langley and the MMAP have been much more successful in locating submerged archaeological sites. After locating the site, Langley and her team have a strict process in order to preserve the site and its contents, allowing more accurate and thorough research to be conducted. The remains of nearly every site have been submerged in saltwater for sometimes centuries, the integrity of shipwrecks and other materials are fragile and careful precaution must be used when working with them. Taking photos and videos, creating maps, and constructing models are all a part of the process of preserving remains. Susan Langley notes herself, "If you have only ten percent of a ship's hull, you can reconstruct the ship. Construction techniques can tell us about the people who built the vessels, artifacts can tell us about the people who profited from the ship's trade, and eco-facts—evidence of insect infestation and organic remains, such as seeds, that are preserved in anaerobic, muddy environments—can tell us about the climate and season when a ship sank." Still, the MMAP makes it a point to publish their data and information once a site is officially identified; however, the details of the location are left out to sway would-be looters, who have plagued marine archaeologists for decades.

=== Significant sites ===
Altogether there are more than 1,800 ship and boat wrecks that scatter the bottom of the Chesapeake Bay and its surrounding waterways. Dozens of precolonial era canoes and artifacts have been extracted from the bay, helping to portray a better picture of the lives of Native Americans (e.g., Powhatan, Pamunkey, Nansemond) In 1974, scallop fishermen dredged up the skull of a prehistoric mastodon, which through carbon dating was found to be 22,000 years old. Along with the skull, a carved blade was also discovered in the same area. Unable to accurately carbon date the stone tool, archaeologists looked at similar styles of blade carving in order to gauge when it was made. The technique was similar to the Solutrean tools that were crafted in Europe between 22,000 and 17,000 years ago and it was noted that the stone tool must be at least 14,000 years old. The Solutrean hypothesis challenges the previous theory regarding the first inhabitants of North America, whereas it is commonly accepted amongst anthropologists that the Clovis people were the first to settle the region somewhere around 13,000 years ago. There is some controversy surrounding these findings; many anthropologists have disputed this, claiming that the environment and setting make properly identifying the origins of these artifacts nearly impossible.

The Chesapeake Bay Flotilla, which was constructed using shallow barges and ships to counter British naval attacks during the War of 1812. After holding strong for some months, the British eventually defeated the flotilla and dozens of these vessels were burnt and sunk. Starting in 1978, there were numerous expeditions launched in hopes of successfully discovering what was left of the Chesapeake Bay Flotilla. Since then, hundreds of artifacts and remains have been extracted from the submerged ships such as weapons, personal items, and many other objects. Underwater archaeologists have also been successful in constructing accurate models and maps of the wreckage amongst the sea floor.

In October 1774, the British merchant brig Peggy Stewart arrived at the port of Annapolis loaded with tea disguised as linens and garments. The tea was hidden by the ship's crew to avoid conflict with local colonists as the recently imposed tea tax had created hostility and uncertainty in the colonies. The crew of Peggy Stewart informed the colonists of the new taxes for the purchased tea. The colonists refused to pay the tax and after a few days of public meetings, the colonists decided to burn Peggy Stewart and the contents of it. The brig was burnt to the waterline in what became known as the 'Annapolis Tea Party' and has since become an important site for underwater archaeologists in the Chesapeake Bay. In 1949, after the Nazi's defeat in World War 2, the United States seized a German U-1105 built with sonar-evading rubber sheathing for study purposes. It was sunk the same year in the Potomac River off of the Chesapeake Bay following a high explosives test hosted by the U.S. Navy and has since been a popular site for underwater archaeologists.

Maryland has controlled the majority of underwater archaeology research around the Chesapeake Bay; however, Virginia's Department of Historic Resources has had a State Underwater Archaeologist since the 1970s. In 1982, the Virginia Department of Historic Resources along with the first State Underwater Archaeologist, John Broadwater, led an expedition to explore and research a sunken fleet of Revolution-era battleships. In September 1781, during the Revolutionary War, the British scuttled more than a dozen ships in the York River, near the mouth of the Chesapeake Bay. Under the ultimate command of Lord Cornwallis, a group of British ships was pushed back towards the rivers of the Chesapeake, and to avoid them from falling into French and Spanish hands, Cornwallis began ordering them to be scuttled with the hopes of stalling the incoming Franco-American forces. Cornwallis was eventually forced to surrender on October 19 and the ships along with its contents were at the bottom of the York River. One of the British ships, Betsy, has been explored more than any other and over 5,000 relics were removed from Betsy on their original expedition in 1982, including weapons, personal objects, and some valuable metals. Broadwater and his team were awarded a 20-page article in the magazine National Geographic for their findings. Virginia has recently been granted funding for further research of these sunken vessels and expeditions are currently underway with the goal to fully explore the scuttled ships. Unfortunately, following the publicity of these sunken ships, many divers have taken it upon themselves to explore the wreckage for 'treasure'.

== Publications ==
There are several magazines and publications that cover topics directly related to the Chesapeake Bay and life and tourism within the bay region:

- The Bay Journal provides environmental news for the Chesapeake Bay watershed region.
- Bay Weekly is the Chesapeake Bay region's independent newspaper.
- The Capital, a newspaper based in Annapolis, reports about news pertaining to the Western Shore of Maryland and the Annapolis area.
- Chesapeake Bay Magazine and PropTalk focus on powerboating in the bay, and SpinSheet focuses on sailing.
- What's Up Magazine is a free monthly publication with special issues focused on Annapolis and the Eastern Shore.

== Cultural depictions ==
=== In literature ===
- Beautiful Swimmers: Watermen, Crabs and the Chesapeake Bay (1976), a Pulitzer Prize-winning non-fiction book by William W. Warner about the Chesapeake Bay, blue crabs, and watermen.
- Chesapeake (1978), a novel by author James A. Michener.
- Chesapeake Requiem: A Year with the Watermen of Vanishing Tangier Island (2018), by Earl Swift, a New York Times bestselling nonfiction book about the crabbing community of the Chesapeake Bay.
- Dicey's Song (1983) and the rest of Cynthia Voigt's Tillerman series are set in Crisfield on the Chesapeake Bay.* John Barth wrote two novels featuring the Chesapeake Bay
- Jacob Have I Loved (1980) by Katherine Paterson, winner of the 1981 Newbery Medal. This is a novel about the relationship between two sisters in a waterman family who grow up on an island in the bay.
- Patriot Games (1987), in which protagonist Jack Ryan lives on the fictional Peregrine Cliffs overlooking the Chesapeake Bay, and Without Remorse (1993), in which protagonist John Kelly (later known as John Clark when he goes to work for the CIA), lives on a boat and an island in the bay, both by Tom Clancy.
- Red Kayak (2004) by Priscilla Cummings portrays class conflict between waterman people and wealthy newcomers.
- Sabbatical: A Romance (1982) centered on a yacht race through the bay, and The Tidewater Tales (1987) detailed a married couple telling stories to each other as they cruise the bay, both novels by John Barth.
- The Oyster Wars of Chesapeake Bay (1997) by John Wennersten, on the Oyster Wars in the decades following the Civil War.

=== In film ===
- The Bay, a 2012 found footage-style eco-horror movie about a pandemic due to deadly pollution from chicken factory farm run-off and mutant isopods and aquatic parasites able to infect humans.
- Expedition Chesapeake, A Journey of Discovery, a 2019 film starring Jeff Corwin created by The Whitaker Center for Science and the Arts.

=== In TV ===
- In Chesapeake Shores, the O'Brien family lives in a small town in the bay, not far from Baltimore.
- In MeatEater by Steven Rinella, Season 8, Episode 3–4 "Ghosts of the Chesapeake" features the Chesapeake Bay eastern shore.

=== Other media ===
- Singer and songwriter Tom Wisner recorded several albums, often about the Chesapeake Bay. The Boston Globe wrote that Wisner "always tried to capture the voice of the water and the sky, of the rocks and the trees, of the fish and the birds, of the gods of nature he believed still watched over it all." He was known as the "Bard of the Chesapeake Bay."
- The Atlanta-based band Starbuck referenced the Chesapeake Bay in their debut single, "Moonlight Feels Right", which reached the No. 3 position on the Billboard Hot 100 singles charts in 1976.
- The Chesapeake Bay is referenced in the hit musical Hamilton, in the song "Yorktown (The World Turned Upside Down)." It describes the famous Battle of Yorktown, the last battle in the Revolutionary War. When describing the US army's plan for attack, Hamilton sings: "When we finally drive the British away, Lafayette is there waiting in Chesapeake Bay!"

== See also ==
- Chesapeake Bay Interpretive Buoy System
- Chesapeake Bay Retriever
- Chesapeake Climate Action Network
- Chesepian
- Chessie (sea monster)
- Coastal and Estuarine Research Federation
- Great Ireland
- List of islands in Maryland (with the islands in the bay)
- National Estuarine Research Reserve
- Old Bay Seasoning
