= Helen Virginia (Skipjack boat) =

Built in Crisfield, Maryland, in 1948

The Helen Virginia is a Skipjack boat built in Crisfield, Maryland, in 1948. Having fallen into disrepair after decades of use, she underwent restoration beginning in 2013 in Chance, Maryland. The work was completed just in time to enter the 55th Annual Deal Island Skipjack Race, where maritime history was made on September 1, 2014, as the first-ever all-female skipjack crew, captained by Katarina Ennerfelt, sailed her to victory.

== The vessel ==
The Helen Virginia is a 43.2 feet (13.2 m) Skipjack, built during the post-WWII revival of skipjack building on the Chesapeake Bay. Designed by Caroll Bozman and built by Gus Forbush of Crisfield, Maryland, Helen Virginia sailed out of Deal Island, dredging oysters under Capt. Carroll Bozman and later, Capt. Jack Parkinson. She has a beam of 16 feet (4.9 m) and an overall length of 65 feet (20 m).

A 1987 entry in the Maryland State Archives notes that "Helen Virginia is a 43.2' long two-sail bateau, or v-bottomed deadrise type of centerboard sloop, commonly referred to as a skipjack... She carries a typical skipjack rig of jib-headed mainsail and a single large jib with a club on its foot. Built in 1948 in Crisfield, Maryland following traditional Bay design and construction methods, Helen Virginia is significant as one of the 35 surviving traditional Chesapeake Bay skipjacks and a member of the last commercial sailing fleet in the United States."

In 1996 the family of Captain Charles Todd, Sr. purchased Helen Virginia from Jack Parkinson. Todd had been a long-time captain and co-owner with his brother of the skipjack Anna Mae Rich. According to the family, Helen Virginia was sunk at the time, but they wanted to save her. After a two-year restoration effort, including a new mast, Helen Virginia was returned to work dredging oysters. She was sold to Robert Wilson following the passing of Captain Todd in 2006.

She underwent a refitting by Robert Wilson in 2006. By December 2008, she was listed for sale in "Boneyard Boats" and eventually sold to a consortium of four partners, Stoney Whitelock, Katarina Ennerfelt, Richard Long & Frank Antes, in 2013.

Helen Virginia had, by that time, been sitting on dry land for at least two years and had fallen into disrepair. She was patched up with boards covering the major leaks, placed in the water, and pumped out for three days until her wood had swollen enough to stay afloat while being towed from Ruark's Boatyard in Cambridge, Maryland, to Deal Island for a restoration. Witnesses at the start of the trip said later that they doubted she would make it without sinking. During the trip, the pumps were running the entire distance and by the time they arrived, her sides were beginning to break apart.

She arrived after the 12-hour trip to Scott's Cove Marina in Chance, Maryland, and full restoration work began in May 2013. The effort was completed on August 22, 2014. Helen Virginia has been on the National Register of Historic Places since 1985.

== First all-female skipjack crew ==
Swedish-born Katarina Ennerfelt, longtime sailor and part owner of Helen Virginia, had previously captained the Hilda M. Willing in the 2013 Choptank Heritage Skipjack Race in Cambridge, Maryland. That led to the idea of an all-female crew as a way to draw attention to the historic Chesapeake Bay fleet of skipjacks. In an interview, Ennerfelt stated that “We wanted to do this to create some noise about the Skipjacks. There are not many remaining, and to restore the ones we have left is a major undertaking, both financially and physically.”

The decision was made to form a crew made up of local Deal Island and Chance women, as opposed to assembling a crew of the most experienced female sailors. Five of the nine crew members had never sailed before. The crew that was selected to train and enter the race consisted of Katarina Ennerfelt (captain), Eileen Cross, Carrie Day, April Hall, April Benton, Josie Brown, Elizabeth Weglein, Sarah Gleason, and Melissa Bailey. The crew trained for a total of 30 hours over five weeks, part of that time being spent painting Helen Virginia to get her ready in time for the race. Since the restoration of the vessel was not completed until ten days before the race, the crew practiced on the Rebecca Ruark with Captain Wade Murphy, and with the crew aboard Nathan of Dorchester, two skipjacks that would compete with them on race day. The crew was only able to begin training together aboard Helen Virginia on the Friday before the Monday race.

== The race ==
The weather forecast for Deal Island on Labor Day—September 1, 2014—called for rain and scattered thunderstorms all day. However, the skies cleared during the race and the ten competing skipjacks sailed under blue skies and hot sun. Every crew member aboard Helen Virginia stayed at their stations the entire race, even sharing a water bottle between four of them when the heat became intense, rather than risking one of them leaving their post for more water. By about 30 yards from the finish line, it was clear that they would win, and the emotions of making history finally took over as the crowds on shore gave a standing ovation. Captain Katarina Ennerfelt said after the race, "When we started to get really, really close to the finish line and then it was like okay we're going to win now. We haven't won yet. And then, we were twenty-five yards out and started crying."

"When we crossed the finish line we were hugging and crying," said April Benton.

Captain Ennerfelt donated the $1,000 prize back to the race sponsor, the Deal Island-Chance Lions Club.

== Other Helen Virginia events ==
Helen Virginia has continued to race in skipjack events, including the 18th Annual Choptank Heritage Skipjack Race in Cambridge, Maryland in 2014, placing fourth. She also represented the skipjacks of the Chesapeake Bay at the 2014 Annapolis Boat Show. She will be working dredging oysters off Deal Island during oyster harvesting season, and will resume racing in the off-season.
