= Harris Branch (Brazil Creek tributary) =

Stream in the American state of Missouri

Coordinates: 38.0822693°N 91.0890278°W

Harris Branch is a stream in Washington County in the U.S. state of Missouri. It is a tributary of Brazil Creek.

The identity of the namesake of Harris Branch is unknown.

== See also ==
- List of rivers of Missouri
