= Polyhaline =

Polyhaline or Mixo-haline, is a salinity category term applied to brackish estuaries and other marine waters with a salinity between 18 and 30 parts per thousand. It was classified using the Venice System of classification. This system of classifying emerged in 1958 from the Venice Symposium. It is the most dense saltwater type that is classified as "brackish." A prominent example of polyhaline water is the Chesapeake Bay. Moving down the Bay towards the Atlantic Ocean is the brackish water. In these waters you can find submerged aquatic vegetation (SAV). Two different types of species can withstand the high salt concentration, Eelgrass and Widgeon grass. Eelgrass prefers high salinity but is intolerant to heat. Widgeon grass tolerates the salty conditions and provides food for fish and birds. SAV provide food and shelter for many Bay species. These aquatic vegetation act as nutrient absorbers. They specifically uptake carbon dioxide and provide oxygen to their surrounding environment. So when algal blooms— an excess of nutrients leading to areas of no oxygen, dead zones— emerge, these grasses absorb the excess nutrients. Species and organisms that live in polyhaline need to withstand a high salt concentration. Some of these organisms include shrimp, crustaceans, and plenty of fish.

== See also ==
- Salinity
