= Harris Creek (Missouri) =

Stream in Ripley County, Missouri, U.S.

Coordinates: 36.5492258°N 90.6928952°W

Harris Creek is a stream in Ripley County in the U.S. state of Missouri.

Harris Creek was named after Washington Harris, an early resident.

== See also ==
- List of rivers of Missouri
