= Harris Branch (Flat River tributary) =

Stream in the American state of Missouri

Coordinates: 37.8281066°N 90.5381806°W

Harris Branch is a stream in St. Francois County in the U.S. state of Missouri. It is a tributary of the Flat River.

Harris Branch has the name of Henry Harris, the original owner of the site.

== See also ==
- List of rivers of Missouri
