= Oyster Recovery Partnership =

U.S. non-profit organization

- Formation: 1972; 54 years ago
- Type: 501(c)(3) nonprofit
- Tax ID no.: 23-7204806
- Purpose: Shellfish sustainability
- Location(s): Annapolis, Maryland, United States
- Website: oysterrecovery.org

The Oyster Recovery Partnership (ORP) is a 501(c)(3) nonprofit organization that leads conservation efforts of the native Eastern oyster, Crassostrea virginica, in the Chesapeake Bay and Eastern United States. The organization's activities and programs include oyster restoration, shell recycling conservation, and sustainable fishery initiatives.

== History ==
The organization was established in 1972 and originally known as Chesapeake Appreciation, Inc. The organization name and brand were formally changed to the Oyster Recovery Partnership (ORP) in 1994. ORP is headquartered in Annapolis, Maryland. The organization has received support from the United States Environmental Protection Agency, State of Maryland, and Baltimore County.

=== Programs ===
ORP plants the native oyster, Crassostrea virginica, back into the Chesapeake Bay. In 2022, the organization helped to plant over 950,000,000 oysters. The organization also works to provide educational opportunities to shellfish farmers on best practices for managing their oyster farms and leases.

In addition, the organization works with scientists and researches to study better ways to grow oysters, restore oyster reefs, and advance oyster restoration. ORP also actively works with lawmakers and regulatory agencies to advance policy initiatives that support oyster restoration. The organization created and runs the Shell Recycling Alliance (SRA), an initiative with restaurants, caterers, and seafood wholesales to save used natural oyster shell, regarded as the best material on which to raise new oysters, from ending up in landfills.

=== Leadership ===
The organization is led by a nineteen-member Board of Directors. Notable members of the board include businessman Jim Perdue and James King, former member of the Maryland House of Delegates.

== See also ==
- Oyster farming
- Oyster reef restoration
