= Harris Creek (British Columbia) =

Creek in the Okanagan region of British Columbia, Canada

Coordinates: 50°12′N 119°0′W

Harris Creek is a creek in the Okanagan region of British Columbia. The creek is located to the south of the village of Lumby in the North Okanagan. Harris Creek has been mined for gold. The total output mined for Harris Creek amounts to $125,000.

Harris Creek flows northwest into Bessette Creek, a tributary of the Shuswap River.
