= Rockshire =

Coordinates: 39°04′49″N 77°11′0″W

Rockshire is a small community located in Rockville in Montgomery County, Maryland. It neighbors Fallsmead, Woodley Gardens, and Willows of Potomac. Fallsmead Elementary School, Lakewood Elementary School, Robert Frost Middle School, and Thomas Sprigg Wootton High School are all in Rockshire.
