= Operation Fly, Inc. =

American non-profit organization

- Type: Non-Profit 501(c)(3)
- Industry: Homeless, poverty, tutoring, media, scholarship, youth organization
- Founded: Gaithersburg, Maryland (July 17, 2007)
- Founder: Timothy Hwang; Minsoo Han
- Headquarters: Washington, D.C., US
- Area served: Washington, D.C. (Main), Baltimore, MD, Chicago, IL, New York, New York
- Products: Tutoring, newsletter, services for the homeless and underprivileged
- Members: 80
- Website: operationfly.org

Operation Fly Inc. was a 501(c)(3) non-profit organization that was originally formed to serve the inner-city population within Washington, D.C., and its surrounding metropolitan area. They also had branches in New York City and Chicago. The organization coordinated community events and programs for the homeless—such as food distribution programs and banquets—as well as for financially underprivileged students and their schools.

The program consisted of several student volunteers from different schools across the United States and Canada, and was completely student-led.

== History ==
After more than two years of planning, Operation Fly Inc. was founded in 2007 by Timothy Hwang and Minsoo Han (both students from Thomas S. Wootton High School).

The organization had three branches in Washington, D.C., NYC and Chicago. They also had plans to expand to Detroit, Los Angeles, and Houston.

In 2009, founder Timothy Hwang was named Youth Entrepreneur of the Year by Ernst & Young and Junior Achievement of the National Capital Area.

== Sources ==
- Ernst&Young: https://web.archive.org/web/20091114063314/http://myja.org/students/yeoty/
- Voice of America (Radio): http://operationfly.org/Media/USA%20NOW%20071509.Mp3
- Voice of America:
