= 1201 Pennsylvania Avenue =

Coordinates: 38.895642°N 77.028505°W

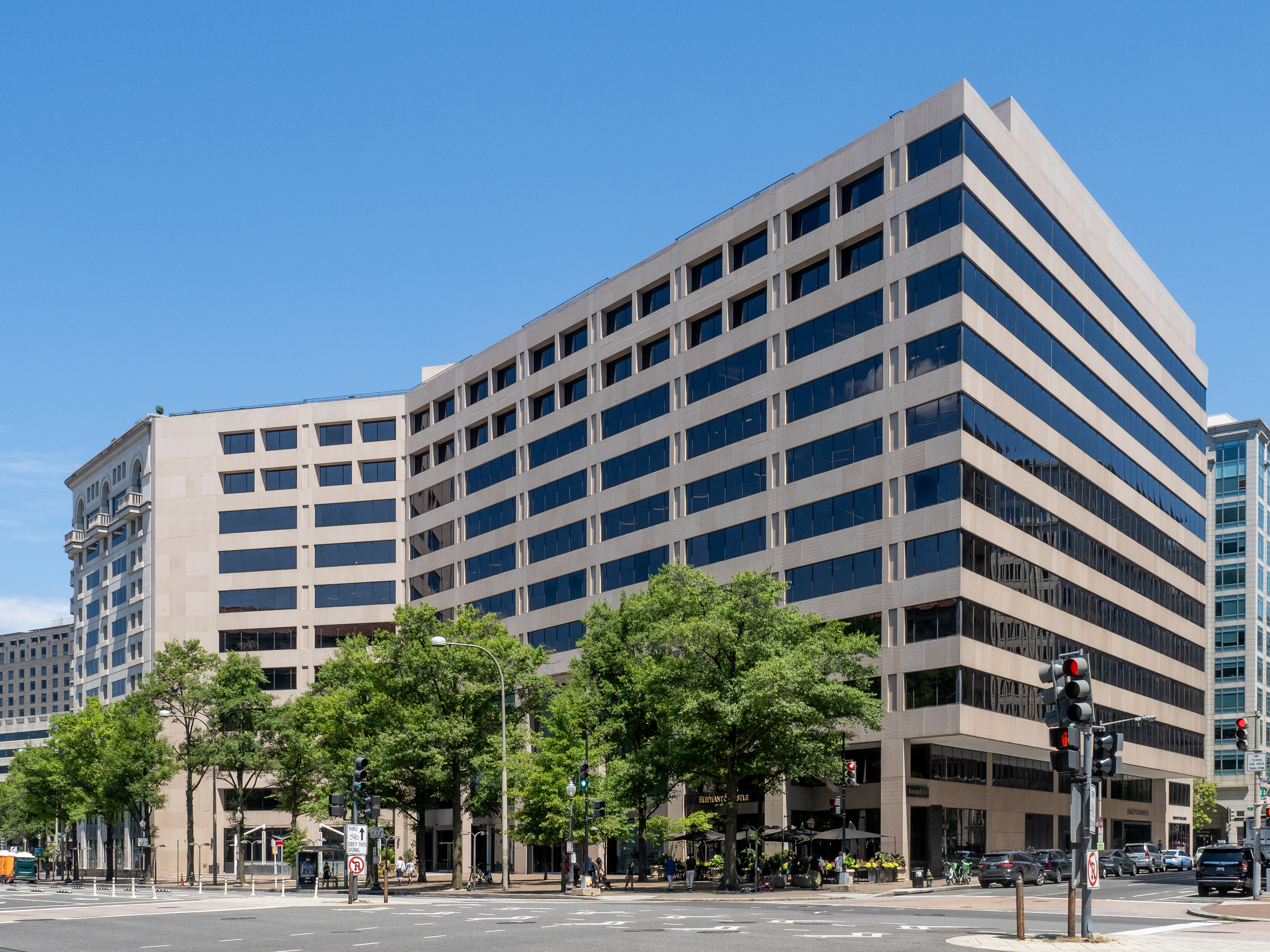
- Interactive map of the 1201 Pennsylvania Avenue area

General information
- Type: Office
- Location: Washington, D.C., United States
- Completed: 1981
- Owner: Sentinel Real Estate

Height
- Roof: 160 feet (49 m)

Technical details
- Floor count: 13

Design and construction
- Architects: Skidmore, Owings & Merrill LLP

1201 Pennsylvania Avenue is a highrise office building in Washington, D.C., on Pennsylvania Avenue. The building is 49 m (160 ft) tall and has approximately 13 floors. Its construction ended in 1981. It was designed by Skidmore, Owings & Merrill, LLP.

Current tenants include FiscalNote.

== See also ==
- List of tallest buildings in Washington, D.C.
