= FiscalNote =

American software, data and media company

FiscalNote Holdings, Inc.
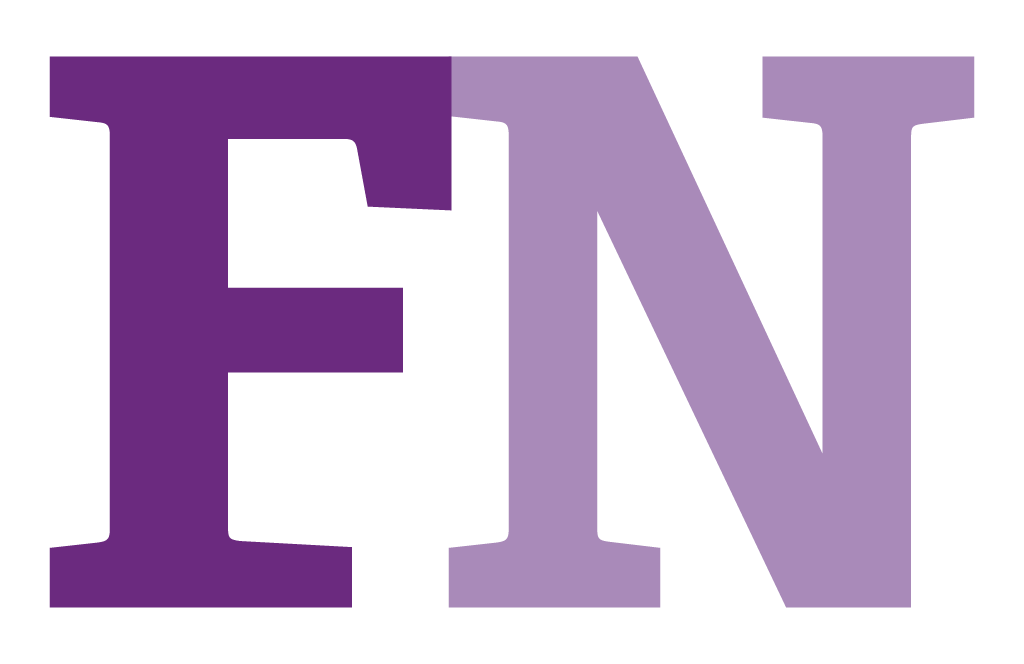

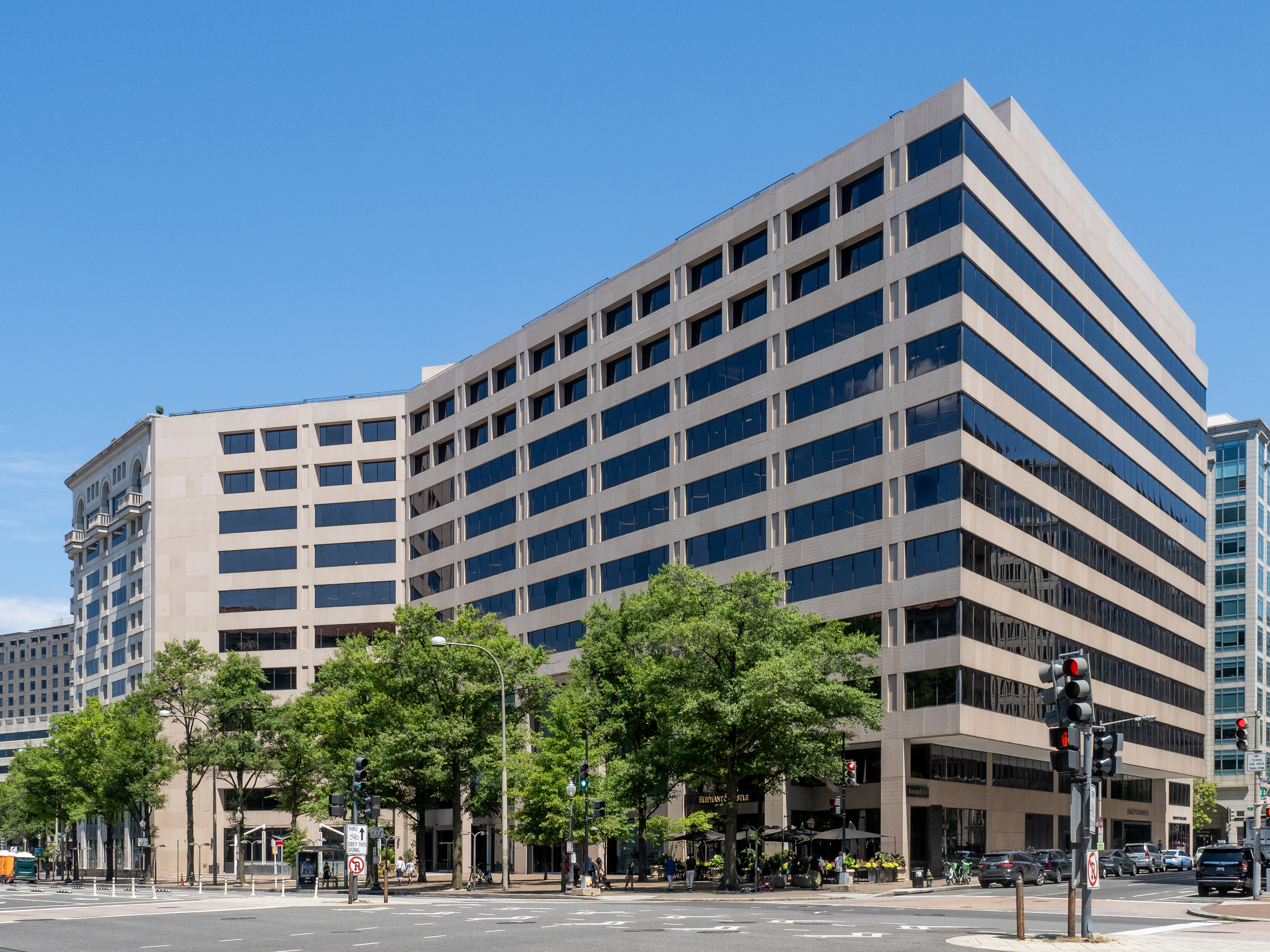
- Type: Private
- Traded as: NYSE: NOTE (Class A) (Delisted as of March 2026)
- Industry: Software as a service; information services; technology
- Founded: June 2013; 13 years ago in Sunnyvale, California, US
- Founders: Timothy Hwang; Gerald Yao; Jonathan Chen
- Headquarters: 1201 Pennsylvania Avenue, Washington, D.C.
- Number of locations: 13 Washington, D.C.; New York City; Austin, TX, Baton Rouge, LA; Madison, WI; Brussels, Belgium; Gurugram, India; Oxford, UK; Seoul, Korea; Sydney, Australia; Hong Kong; Singapore
- Number of employees: 600+
- Website: fiscalnote.com

FiscalNote Holdings, Inc., or commonly FiscalNote, is a publicly traded software, data, and media company headquartered in Washington, D.C. The company was founded by Timothy Hwang, Gerald Yao, and Jonathan Chen in 2013. FiscalNote provides software tools, platforms, data services, and news through the FiscalNote Government Relationship Management (GRM) service, its core product. The company also uses an artificial intelligence platform to analyze proposed U.S. legislation based on key phrases, comparison to similar bills, lists of strengths and weaknesses, a timeline of the committees it has passed, information about the bill's sponsors, and past legislator voting records.

In July 2018, FiscalNote acquired CQ Roll Call, a publishing company that produces several publications, including Roll Call and CQ (formerly Congressional Quarterly), that cover legislative processes, policies, and elections in the United States Congress.

In July 2022, FiscalNote launched FiscalNote ESG Solutions, a suite of services designed to assist organizations in meeting environmental, social, and corporate governance (ESG) targets.

As of March 25, 2026, FiscalNote was delisted from the NYSE and is traded on the OTCID exchange.

== History ==
FiscalNote was founded in 2013 in Sunnyvale, California, by Timothy Hwang, Gerald Yao, and Jonathan Chen, all former schoolmates at Thomas S. Wootton High School in Rockville, Maryland. Hwang, who had just finished his junior year at Princeton, brought Chen and Yao together to Silicon Valley to pitch the company to investors. The company was founded in a Motel 6, where early employees Dan Maglasang and Dev Shah worked to build the product.

In May 2017, FiscalNote announced its initial expansion outside the U.S., providing data sets for Australia and New Zealand.

In June 2017, District of Columbia Mayor Muriel Bowser unveiled a major job training program in partnership with FiscalNote. The program was announced alongside a $750,000 economic development package, introduced as an incentive for the company to stay in DC. FiscalNote moved its headquarters to 1201 Pennsylvania Avenue that year.

In July 2017, FiscalNote announced the availability of data sets for Argentina, Canada, Chile, India, and the United Kingdom.

In 2018 FiscalNote acquired CQ Roll Call, which helped bring stable financial flow with a consistent subscriber base and a competent data set. By adding CQ Roll Call, FiscalNote gained an entryway into the media world and an opportunity to cover what certain bills may mean to subscribers instead of having to interpret the raw data.

In July 2022, FiscalNote unveiled FiscalNote ESG Solutions, a suite of services designed to assist client organizations in meeting environmental, social, and corporate governance (ESG) goals. Alongside from the suite's main offering – an artificial intelligence-based platform designed to streamline data collection and management – tools offered include ESG-related news, research, and analysis briefings, expert advisory services, and access to peer discussion communities.

=== Funding and acquisitions ===
In late 2013, FiscalNote received early seed money from Mark Cuban after a cold email from Timothy Hwang. This was soon followed by an investment from New Enterprise Associates, Yahoo cofounder Jerry Yang, and First Round Capital, leading to a total $1.3 million round.

In fall 2014, FiscalNote received $7 million in its first institutional (and second total) financing round. Investors included AOL founder Steve Case, Visionnaire Ventures (a joint fund between Taizo Son and Temasek), with participation from Jerry Yang, Mark Cuban, New Enterprise Associates, Winklevoss Capital Management, Enspire Capital, Green Visor Capital (led by former Visa Chief Executive Joseph Saunders, and Middleland Capital. Steve Case invested as part of his Rise of the Rest Fund.

In February 2015, FiscalNote announced that it had raised $10 million in a third round of financing. Investors included Chinese social network Renren. The move was a part of a larger move by Renren to diversify beyond its core area of online games and e-commerce in China.

In February 2016, FiscalNote raised another $10 million in a fourth round of financing. The round was led by Green Visor and Visionnaire. FiscalNote later added $5 million to this round with a strategic investment from South Korean conglomerate MoneyToday Media alongside a strategic partnership with its newspaper and television divisions (MTN). This came after FiscalNote's acquisition of MyCandidate in Korea.

In August 2017, FiscalNote acquired 16-year old Baton Rouge company VoterVoice, bringing 1,100 new customers and expanding into the advocacy space. FiscalNote CEO Hwang announced that the acquisition would be the first in "hundreds of millions".

In January 2018, FiscalNote announced at the World Economic Forum in Davos that it had acquired a Brussels-based counterpart called Shungham, giving the company a foothold in the European Union as it seeks to expand globally.

In July 2018, FiscalNote announced that it would acquire Congressional Quarterly and Roll Call from The Economist Group.

In January 2021, FiscalNote announced it had acquired FactSquared, the parent company of White House tracker Factba.se.

In February 2021, FiscalNote announced that it had acquired Oxford Analytica, a UK-based political risk consultancy and publisher of the Oxford Analytica Daily Brief.

On September 15, 2021, the company announced the acquisition of Cambridge, Massachusetts-based artificial intelligence company Forge.AI.

In August 2021, FiscalNote acquired Curate, a civic technology company that provides data to help companies monitor risk and provide clarification at the local government level. In March of 2026, the entire Curate staff was laid off with no notice.

In 2022, FiscalNote acquired Aicel Technology, a South Korean alternative data company that specializes in emerging fintech markets.

In January 2023, FiscalNote acquired Dragonfly Eye Ltd. ("Dragonfly"), a UK-based geopolitical and security intelligence provider of actionable data and analysis delivered through Dragonfly's SaaS-based, proprietary Security Intelligence and Analysis Service (SIAS) subscription platform and API.

== Operations ==
FiscalNote is headquartered in Washington, D.C., with regional headquarters in Seoul, Korea covering Asia and Brussels covering the European Union and the Middle East. Other major offices are in New York City, Baton Rouge, Gurgaon, India. FiscalNote operates in multiple languages and had over 1,300 customers and over 21.9 million users as of January 2018.

=== Advisors and board ===
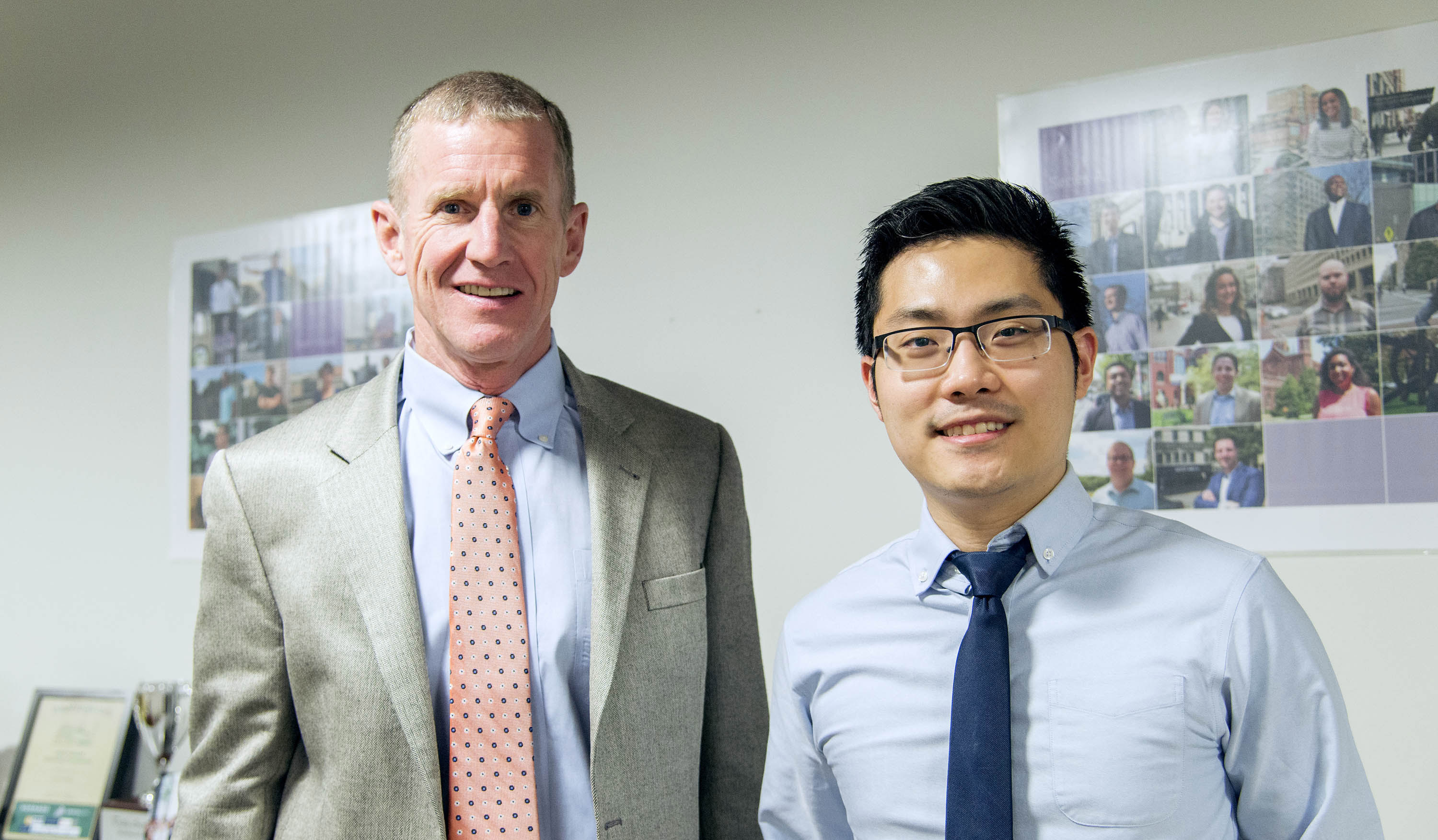
FiscalNote founder (Timothy Hwang) pictured with board member Stanley McChrystal

FiscalNote's board includes General Stanley A. McChrystal, Glenn Hubbard, Alec Ross (author), former Obama White House cabinet secretary and former Deputy Secretary of Labor Chris Lu, Congressman Mike Ferguson, Congressman Glenn Nye, and former publisher of the Washington Post Katharine Weymouth. FiscalNote also added Jayson Kim, General Partner of Legendary Ventures, and Mitch Shue, the former Chief Technology Officer of Morningstar, to their advisory board in 2021.

== Recognition ==
FiscalNote was named to the CNN 10 in 2014.

FiscalNote won the Technology Pioneer Award and Distinction at the annual meeting of the World Economic Forum in 2016.

During the 2017 special presidential election in South Korea after President Park Geun Hye was impeached, FiscalNote launched nudepresident.com, matching South Korean voters with their ideal choice for president using artificial intelligence, correctly predicting that President Moon Jae In would be elected. The mobile application received over 5 million users in several weeks.

In late 2017, FiscalNote researchers discovered that millions of comments submitted to the FCC during the net neutrality debate were forged using bots. Researchers used a variety of natural language processing techniques to uncover the anomalies. Ironically, it was later reported that many of those comments were generated by a FiscalNote subsidiary.

FiscalNote regularly uses its data to publish rankings of lawmakers and their effectiveness.

Curate, a technology platform owned by FiscalNote, won a global award for the best global innovation at the 2022 SAAS Awards.

== Civic technology ==
FiscalNote is a tool of civic technology as it provides organizations or companies with real time governmental policies. This connects companies to the government, allowing them to take notice of what policies may impact their business and allowing companies to stay in compliance while pursuing future goals. In addition, FiscalNote could also help the government gain the public's trust by providing transparency in their actions and policies. FiscalNote could possibly provide insight into more streams of Civic Technology such as providing information to citizens about the different policies representatives are associated with and how that would impact their daily life by voting for them. Another use of FiscalNote is to utilize the extensive dataset they provide to conduct research about different administrations or ideologies in government.

== Controversy ==
FiscalNote has been criticized for the high price of its service, which critics claim excludes citizens and smaller lobbies that cannot afford the product whilst providing wealthier lobbies with information that leaves them better equipped to protect their clients and self interests.

FiscalNote has also been criticised for putting undue weight on correlations that may not necessarily provide relevant insight as to why a certain bill passed or failed. Additionally, John Wilkerson, a political science professor at the University of Washington, criticises FiscalNote for placing importance onto whether individual bills move forward, rather the policies behind them.

== The Economist Group Partnership and 18% Equity ==
On August 20, 2018, the Group completed the sale of CQ-Roll Call, Inc and Capitol Advantage LLC to FiscalNote, Inc. The Economist Group received $80,000,000 cash, $58,557,176 loan notes (12.6% PIK loan notes payable by February 2024) and a minority 18.2% equity interest in FiscalNote, Inc (46,008 Preference shares in FiscalNote, Inc. valued at $41,443,000).

The Economist Group's equity interest was reduced by £12m In FY2020 when FiscalNote raised $54m of additional capital to support its next phase of growth.

On December 29, 2020, the Economist Group sold the interests it acquired in FiscalNote, Inc. for £52,974,000 (US$72,000,000), recognizing a loss on disposal of (£37,151,000).
