= Factba.se =

Website hosting a database of Donald Trump statements

Factba.se is a website that hosts a publicly available, searchable database intended to document statements, speeches, Tweets, and press interviews from U.S. presidents Donald Trump and Joe Biden. It was founded in January 2017 by the Virginia-based husband-and-wife duo of Bill Frischling and Jennifer Canty. In June 2017, it incorporated as FactSquared and announced a round of funding led by Mark Walsh, the former CEO of VerticalNet. These events coincided with Frischling's intent to broaden the site's focus from Trump to the broader realms of politics and business. He also planned to structure the site so that anyone could search its archives of information for free, but there would also be a paid tier for users who wanted to use its proprietary data analysis tools. The site has also developed the $0.99 Trump Feed iPhone app, which compiles a digest of statements made by Trump administration officials. Frischling said in 2017 that almost half of all traffic to Factba.se came from newsrooms, and that CNN, the New York Times, and the Associated Press were "consistently in the top ten domains in terms of traffic" to the site.

In January 2021, DC-based publisher FiscalNote announced that it had acquired Factba.se parent company FactSquared.
