= Timothy Hwang =

American businessman

Tim Hwang
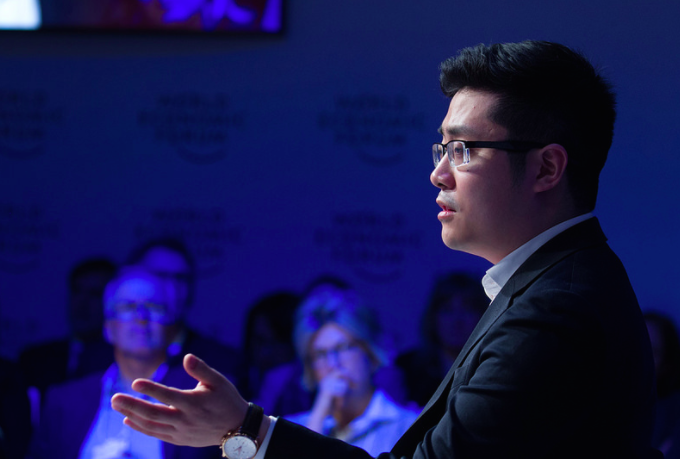
- Tim Hwang at the World Economic Forum, Davos (2018)
- Born: February 20, 1992 (age 34); East Lansing, Michigan, U.S.
- Education: Princeton University (Woodrow Wilson School)
- Known for: Founder of FiscalNote
- Political party: Democratic Party
- Awards: WEF Technology Pioneer; Forbes 30 Under 30; Inc. 30 Under 30

Timothy Taeil Hwang (born February 20, 1992) is an American businessman, the co-founder and former CEO of FiscalNote, a global software, data, and media company.

== Early life ==
Tim Hwang was born on February 20, 1992, in East Lansing, Michigan, the son of immigrants from South Korea. His family later moved to Potomac, Maryland, where he was elected as the student member of the Montgomery County Board Of Education and graduated from Thomas S. Wootton High School in 2010.

At the age of 14, he founded Operation Fly after a church missions trip to Guatemala.

Hwang attended the Woodrow Wilson School at Princeton University, where he was also active in helping to found the National Youth Association (now defunct), a national youth lobby organization. He then was admitted to Harvard Business School.

== Business career ==
In early 2013, as Hwang was finishing his degree at Princeton, he launched FiscalNote along with two friends from high school, Gerald Yao and Jonathan Chen. Hwang deferred his attendance at Harvard Business School to start the company while Yao took a leave of absence from Emory University. At the time, FiscalNote began its service as a state legislative tracking service. Hwang, Yao, and Chen bootstrapped the business with several thousand dollars and incorporated FiscalNote in June 2013.

FiscalNote soon moved the company to Washington, D.C., and raised several rounds of venture capital. The firm has grown to become one of the largest software employers in the District of Columbia. In 2017, Washington DC Mayor Muriel Bowser announced a major job training program and economic development package alongside Hwang, pioneering a new model for technology development in the city. Hwang was the protagonist of a Columbia Business School case study in Fall 2015, a 2016-hour-long Korean Broadcasting System Documentary (Sympathy: Tim Hwang at the Center of Korea's Attention), and a South Korean biography "24 Year Old Tim Hwang: The CEO that the World is Paying Attention To." Hwang has been widely criticized for making critical comments in the South Korean media about the health of the Korean economy, stating that "the Korean economy is like a patient with crutches."

During the COVID-19 pandemic, Hwang fired 30 staff from the CQ Roll Call newsroom, with one source telling AdWeek that the layoffs included the entire team of investigative reporters, and all but one staff member from the print magazine team. A month earlier, Hwang had told a reporter with Washington Business Journal that Roll Call was "on track to bring in $100 million in 2020 revenue and turn a profit.”

Hwang has also been criticized for his handling of FiscalNote during his tenure as CEO, which saw the company's stock plummet, as it lost 95% of its initial value.

Effective January 1, 2025, Hwang moved from chief executive to executive chairman of FiscalNote, and Josh Resnik succeeded him as CEO.

== Philanthropy ==
Hwang is a Trustee on the Board of the Community Foundation of the National Capital Region, a member of the Board of the Afterschool Alliance, a member of The Economic Club of Washington, D.C., and the Young Presidents Organization.
