= Muddy Branch Greenway Trail =

Hiking trail along Muddy Branch Creek in Maryland

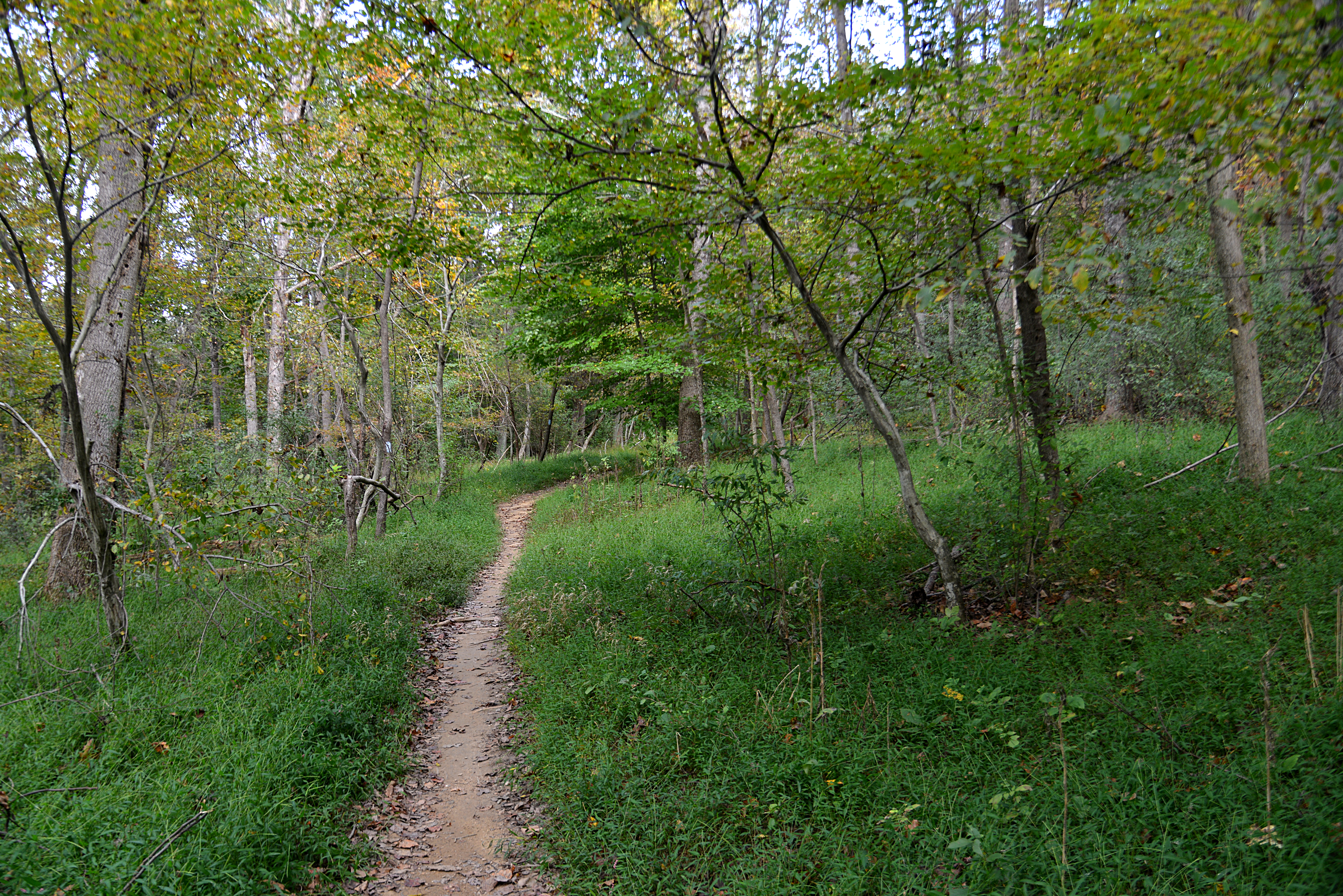
- Muddy Branch Greenway Trail through a grassy forest
- Length: 12 miles (19 km)
- Location: Montgomery County, Maryland
- Trailheads: C&O Canal at Pennyfield Lock, Blockhouse Point Conservation Park, Potomac Horse Center, Darnestown Road, Izaak Walton League, Malcolm King Park
- Use: Hiking, Biking, equestrianism
- Surface: natural, asphalt in Malcolm King Park
- Maintained by: Muddy Branch Alliance
- Website: https://muddybranch.org/maps/

The Muddy Branch Greenway Trail is a 12 miles (19 km) long natural surface trail that runs from the Potomac River to Malcolm King Park in Montgomery County, MD. The trail runs near the course of Muddy Branch, a tributary stream of the Potomac River that originates in Gaithersburg, Maryland.

The trail starts at Pennyfield Lock on the C&O Canal, then runs through Blockhouse Point Conservation Park, across River Road and on to Esworthy Road. From there, the trail crosses the road and enters Muddy Branch Stream Valley Park and continues in the park as far as Darnestown Road. At this point the trail leaves Montgomery County Parks. It then runs behind the Lakelands neighborhood in Gaithersburg, crosses private (but publicly accessible) property at the Izaak Walton League of America national headquarters, and ends on City Park land at Malcolm King Park.

Trail sections
Section	Name
Section 0	Pennyfield Lock (Potomac River) to River Road
Section 1	River Road to Esworthy Road
Section 2	Esworthy Road to Turkeyfoot Road
Section 3	Turkeyfoot Road to Quince Orchard Road
Section 4	Quince Orchard Road to Maryland Route 28
Section 5	Maryland Route 28 to Muddy Branch Road
Section 6	Malcolm King Park

Different parts of the Muddy Branch Greenway Trail

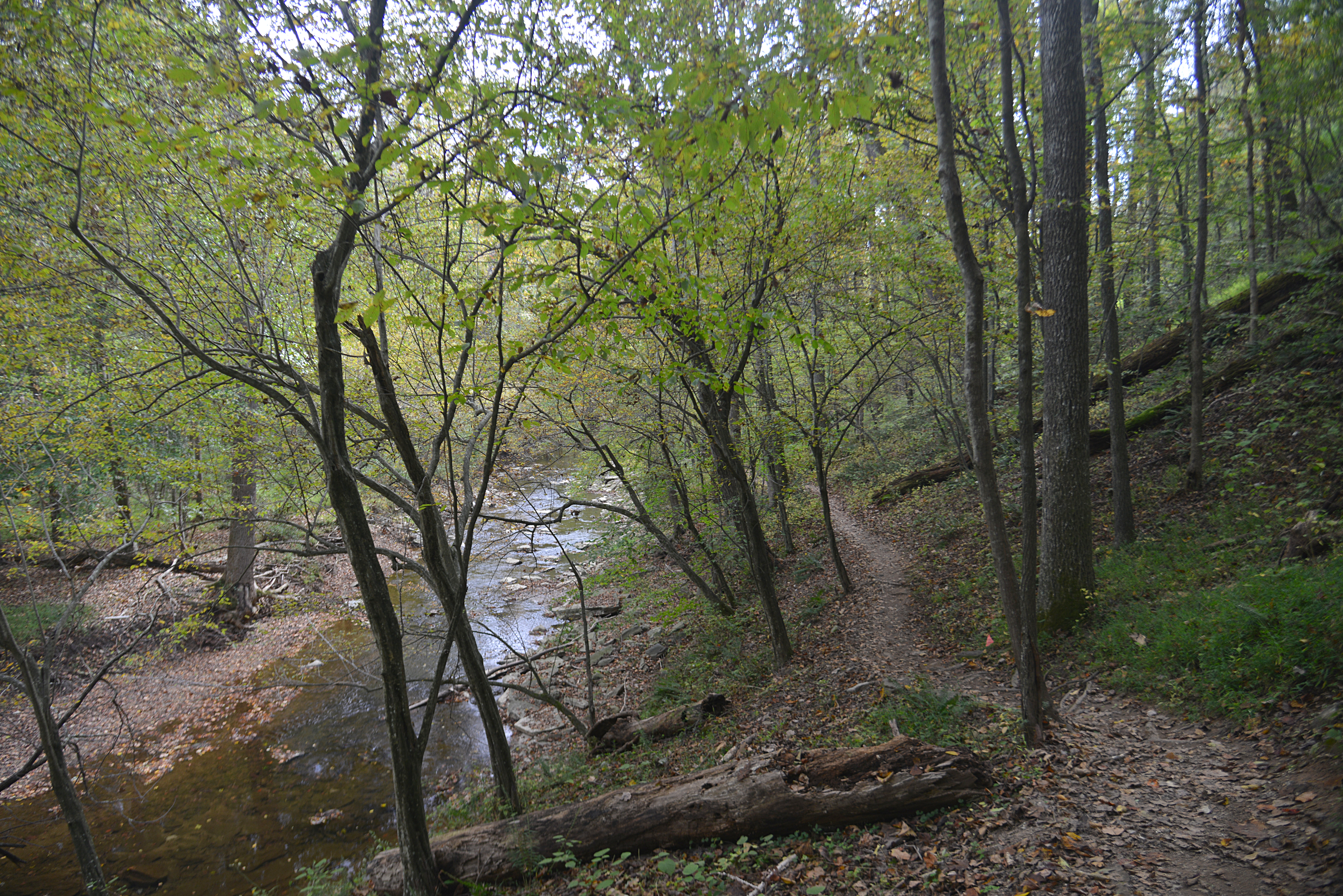
Muddy Branch Stream and Muddy Branch Trail

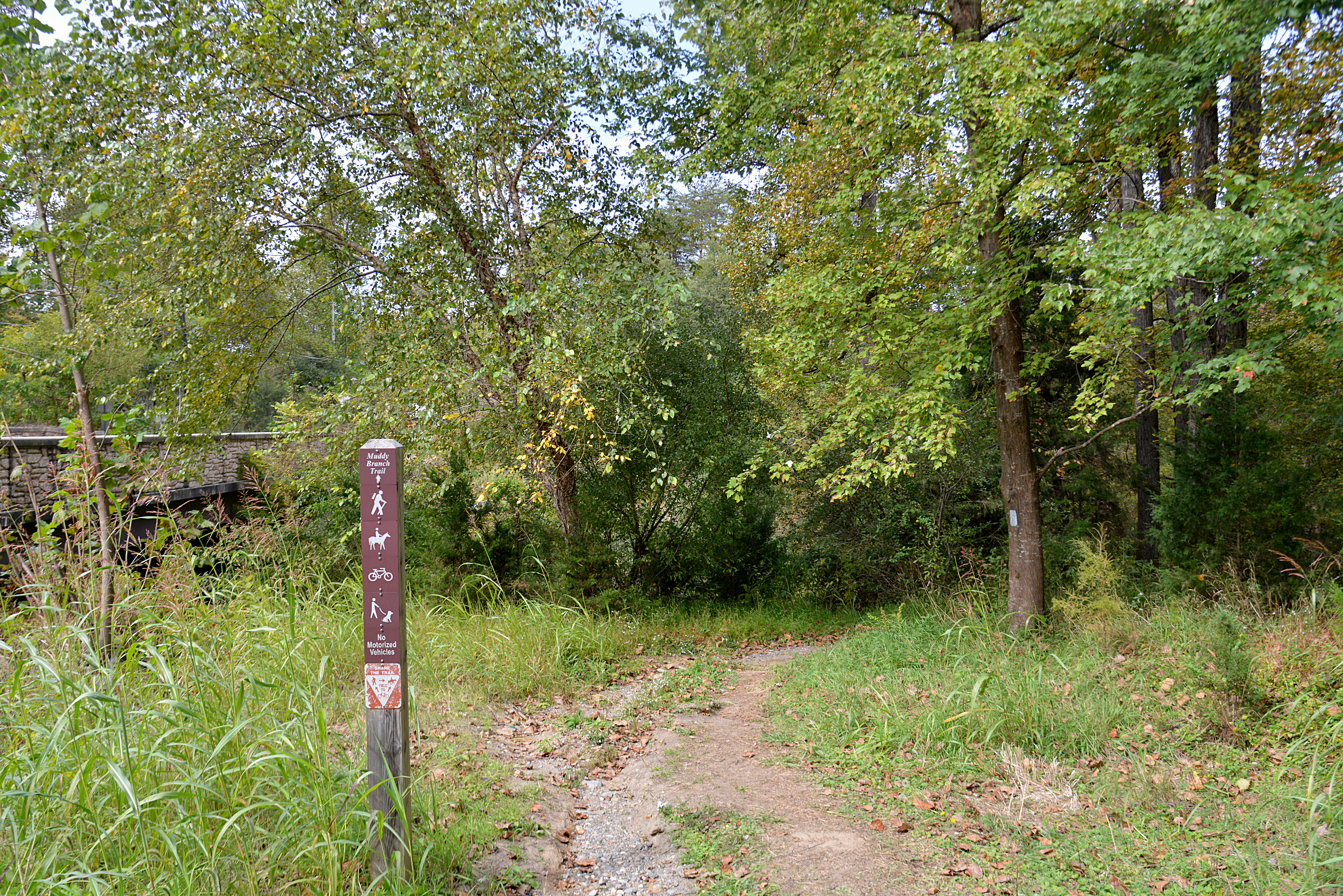
Muddy Branch Greenway Trail, Query Mill trailhead
