= Muddy Branch =

Tributary of the Potomac River in Maryland, United States

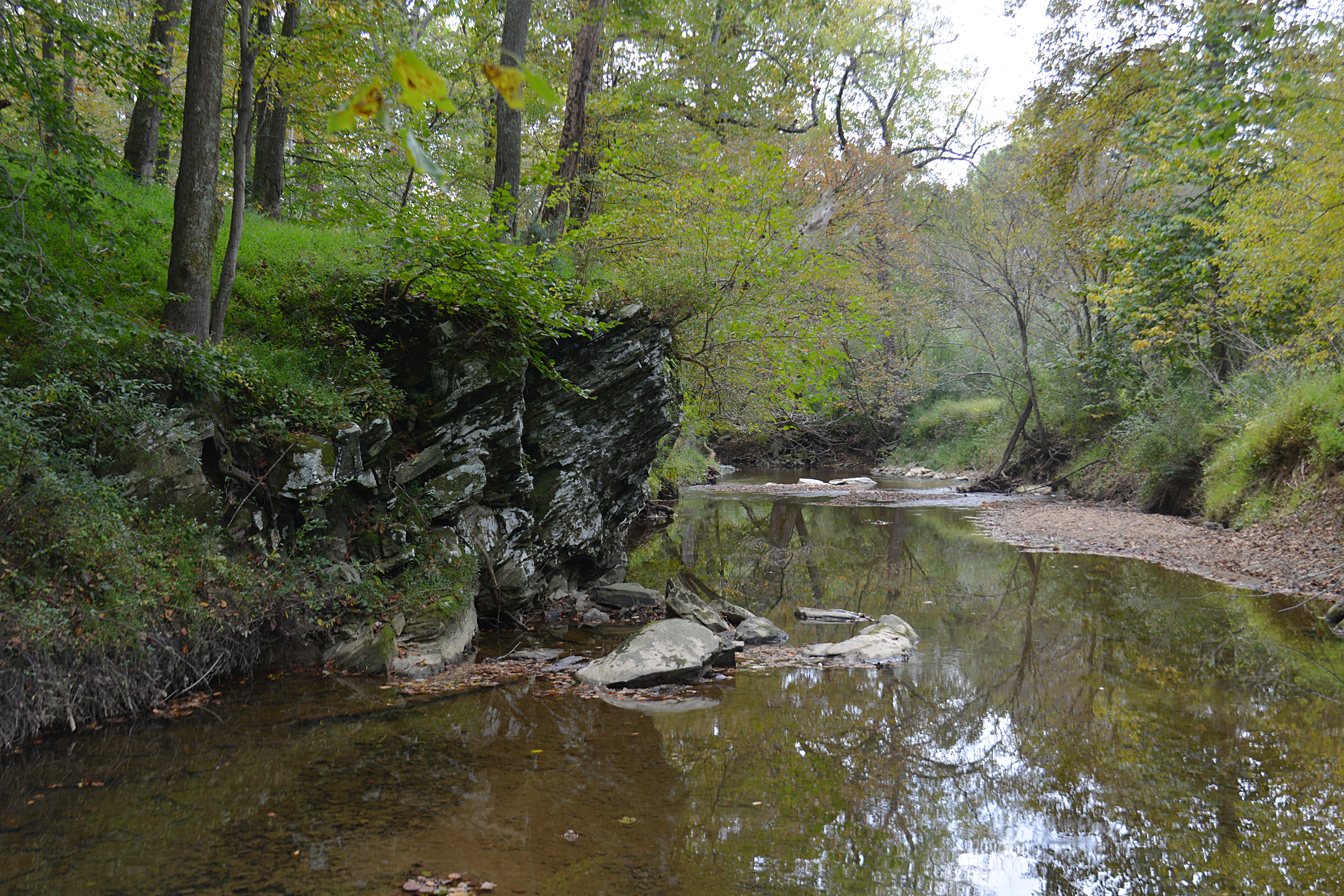
- Muddy Branch Stream near Esworthy Rd

Location
- Country: United States
- State: Maryland
- Counties: Montgomery

Physical characteristics
- Source
  - location: Gaithersburg, MD
- Mouth: Potomac River
  - location: North of Pennyfield Lock, Potomac, MD
  - coordinates: 39°03′16″N 77°17′37″W
- Length: 11.9 mi (19.2 km)

Muddy Branch is a tributary stream of the Potomac River in Montgomery County, Maryland, United States, located about 14 miles (23 km) northwest of Washington, D.C.

== Course ==
The headwaters of the stream originate in Gaithersburg, and the stream flows southwest for 11.9 miles (19.2 km), through Muddy Branch Park and Blockhouse Point Conservation Park, under the Chesapeake and Ohio Canal near Pennyfield Lock, to the Potomac River.

== Tributaries ==
- Decoverly Tributary
- Dufief Tributary
- Lakes Tributary
- Pennyfield Lock Tributary
- Potomac Grove Tributary
- Query Mill Tributary
- Quince Orchard Knolls Tributary
- Rich Branch
- Route 28 Tributary

== Recreation ==
Parts of Muddy Branch flow through Blockhouse Point Conservation Park and the Muddy Branch Stream Valley Park. The Muddy Branch Greenway Trail is a 12 miles (19 km) long natural surface trail that follows the stream from the Potomac River to Malcolm King Park in Gaithersburg, Maryland. There is a boat ramp on Muddy Branch just before it goes under the C & O Canal that can be used by small boats (such as canoes and kayaks) to access the Potomac River.

Different parts of Muddy Branch

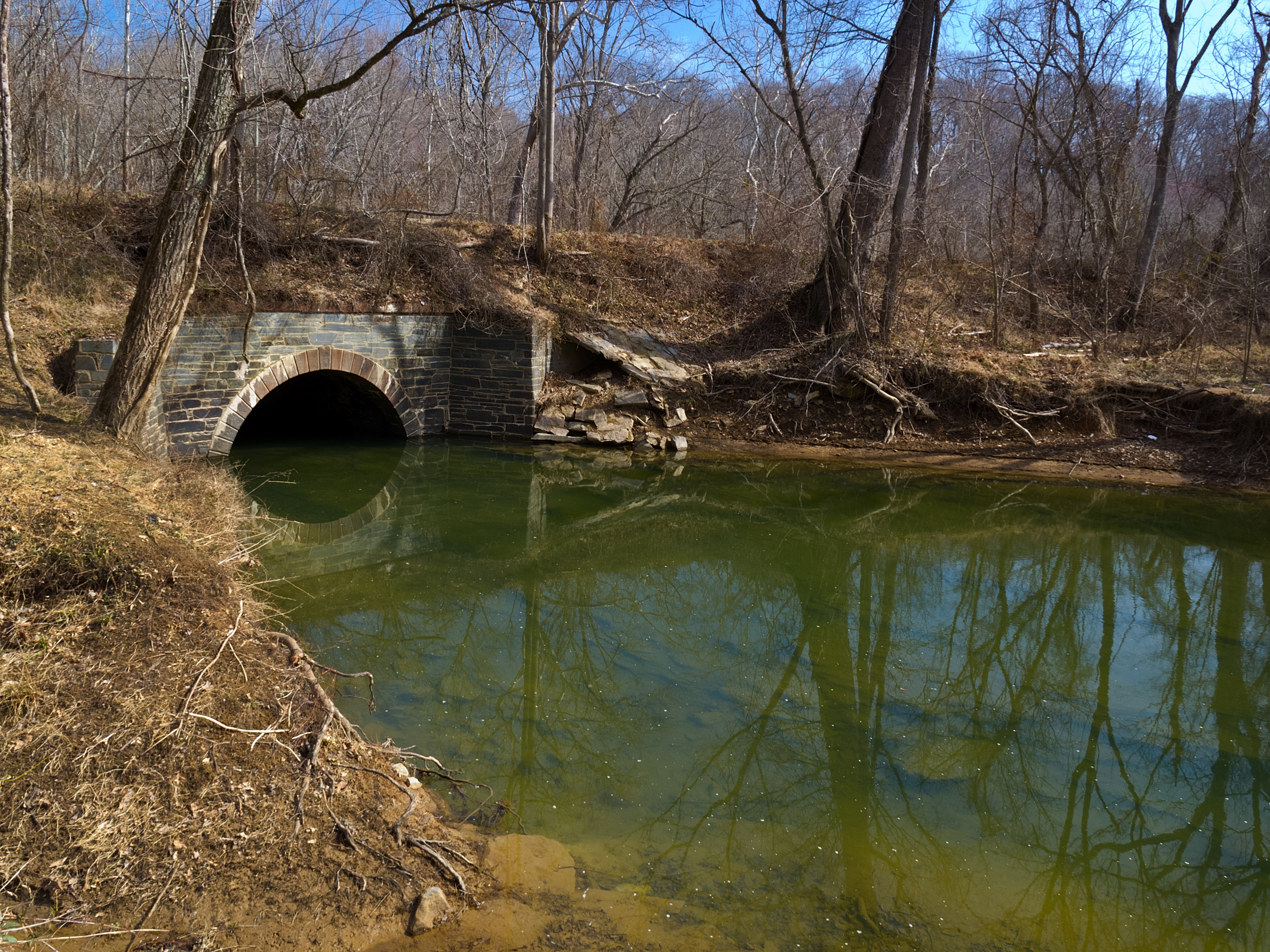
Muddy Branch, crossing under the Chesapeake and Ohio Canal, just before emptying into the Potomac River

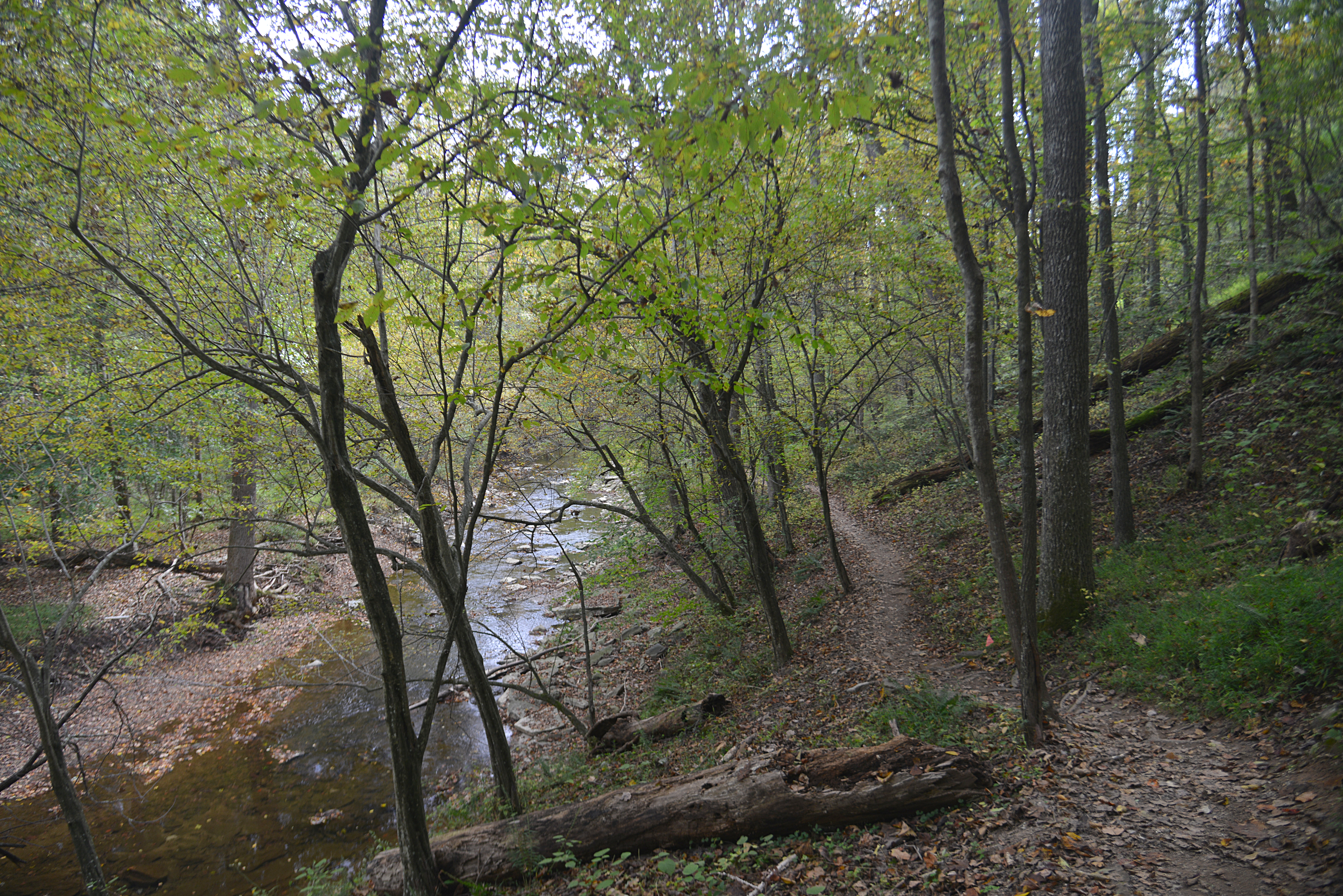
Muddy Branch Stream and the Muddy Branch Greenway Trail

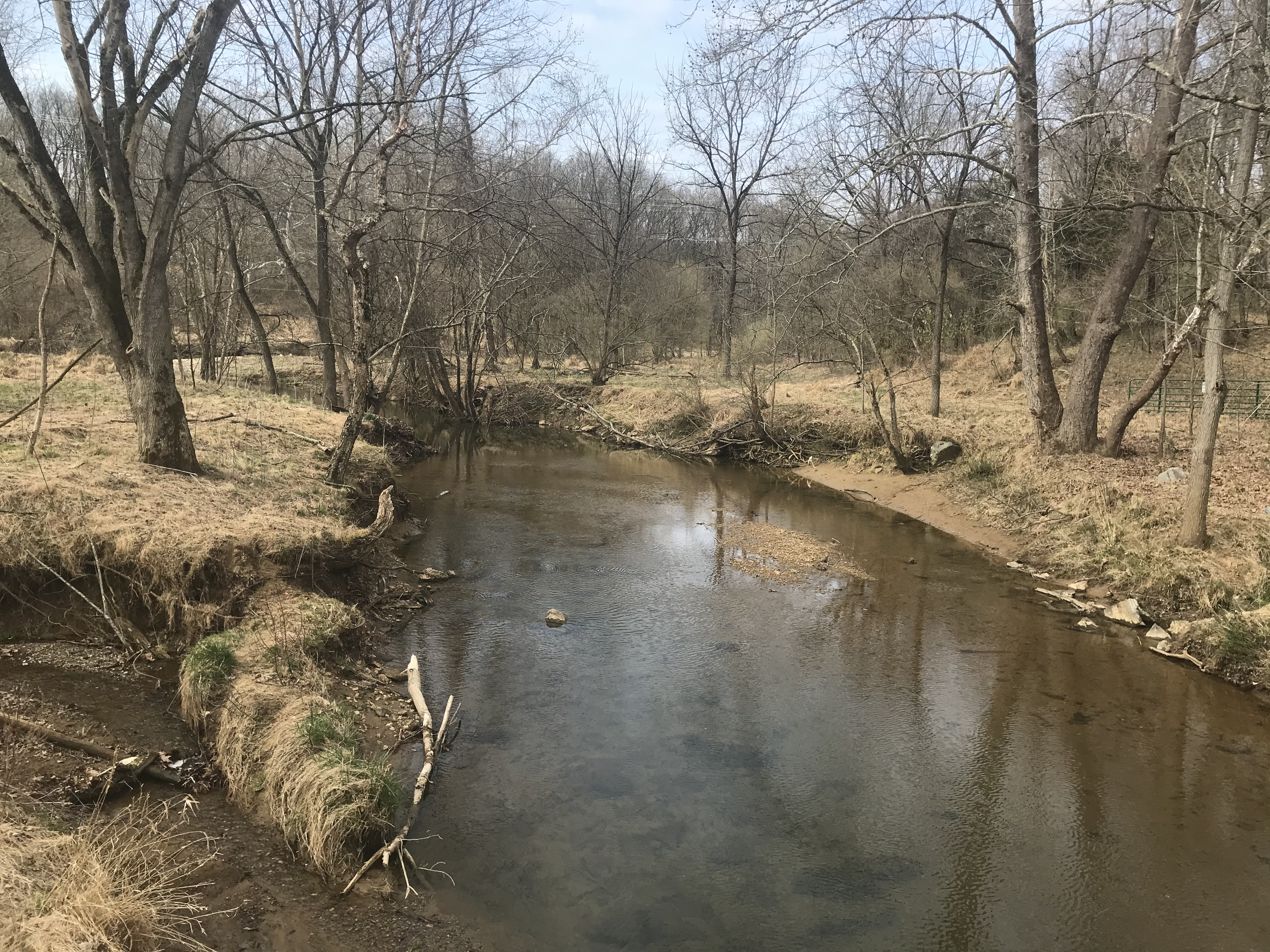
Muddy Branch near Quince Orchard Road in North Potomac, Maryland

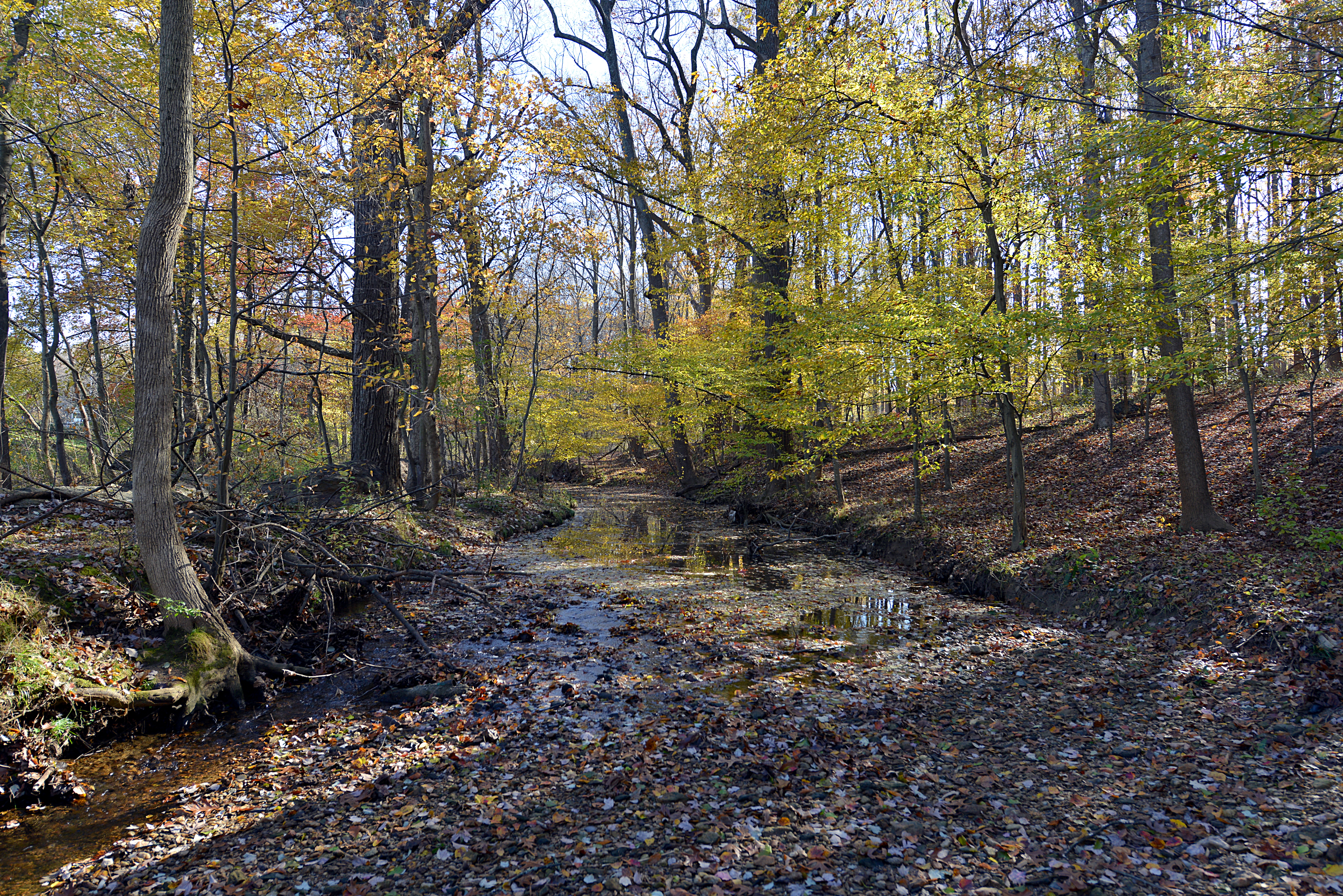
Muddy Branch Stream behind Morris Park, Gaithersburg, Maryland

== See also ==
- List of Maryland rivers
