= Thomas S. Wootton High School =

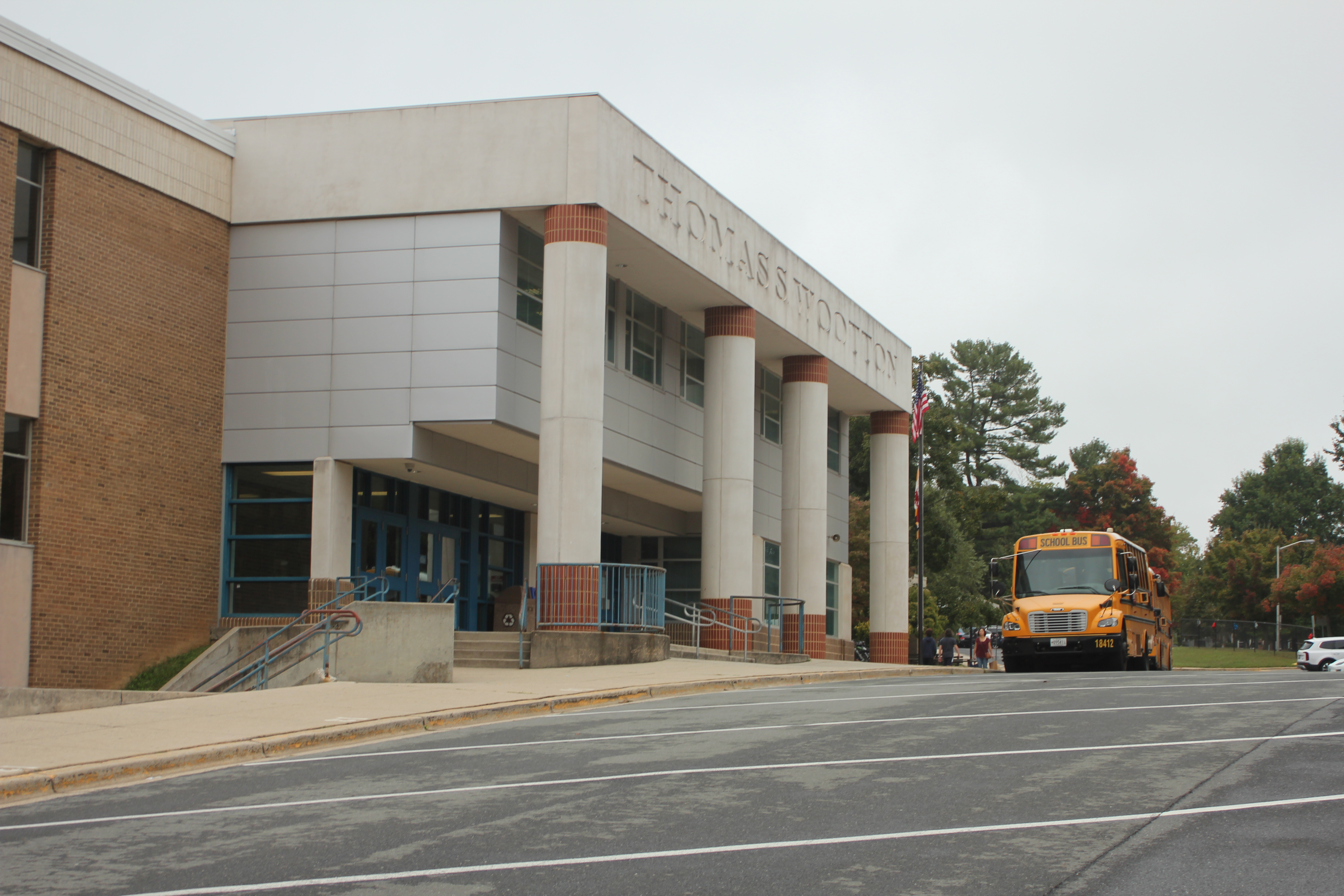

Location
- 2100 Wootton Parkway; Rockville, Montgomery, Maryland 20850-3037; United States; 39.07661°N 77.18376°W

Information
- Type: Public secondary
- Established: 1970; 56 years ago
- School district: Montgomery County Public Schools
- NCES District ID: 2400480
- Educational authority: Maryland Department of Education
- School code: MD-15-150234
- CEEB code: 210909
- NCES School ID: 240048000934
- Principal: Joseph Bostic
- Faculty: 111.80 (on an FTE basis)
- Grades: 9–12
- Gender: Coeducational
- Enrollment: 1,911 (2022-2023)
  - Grade 9: 468
  - Grade 10: 477
  - Grade 11: 432
  - Grade 12: 534
- Student to teacher ratio: 17.38:1
- Campus type: Small city
- Colors: Red, white and blue
- Nickname: Patriots
- Rival: Winston Churchill High School
- USNWR ranking: 195
- Newspaper: Common Sense
- Yearbook: Fife & Drum
- Feeder schools: Cabin John Middle School Robert Frost Middle School
- Website: montgomeryschoolsmd.org/schools/woottonhs/

Thomas S. Wootton High School or Wootton High School (WHS) is a public high school in Rockville, Maryland. Its namesake is Thomas S. Wootton, the founder of Montgomery County, Maryland. The school was founded in 1970 and is part of the Montgomery County Public Schools system. Its school colors are red, white, and blue. The mascot is reflected in the names of the football team (Wootton Patriots) and in the theater department (Wootton Patriot Players).

== Academics ==
In 2019, Newsweek ranked Wootton's STEM program #160 in a nationwide survey of US high schools. In 2022, U.S. News & World Report ranked Wootton #167 nationally amongst high school. As of 2025, Wootton ranks 191st nationally, 3rd in Maryland, and 2nd in Montgomery County Public Schools.

Wootton students average a score of 1288 on the SAT, with 634 on verbal and 654 on math.

== History ==
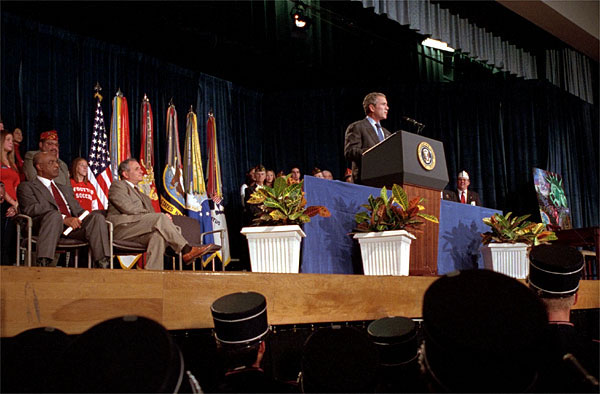
President George W. Bush speaks at Wootton.

In November 2001, President George W. Bush visited Wootton and signed the congressional bill officially recognizing "Veterans Awareness Week", which takes place the week before Veteran's Day.

In 2015, school principal Michael Doran was found dead, due to natural causes in his Bethesda, Maryland, apartment. A memorial service was held at Wootton two days later. In 2017, a bridge near the high school and its auditorium was named in Doran's honor.

== Controversies and incidents ==
On October 9, 2020, former football coach Christopher Papadopoulos was sentenced to 18 months in jail with 5 years of probation with his addition to the Maryland sex offender registry. Papadopolous pleaded guilty to one count of sexual abuse of a minor and one count of fourth-degree sex offense. These charges stemmed from his sexual assault of several 17-year-old minors in his home in Gaithersburg.

On November 2, 2021, a report of a sexual assault occurring in the school's locker room was received by Montgomery County Police. Members of the school's varsity team were allegedly involved in this incident. Several students and staff members were interviewed in an investigation with officers from the police department's Special Victims Investigation Division. However, the investigation yielded no evidence of an occurrence of a sexual assault.

On April 17, 2024, an 18-year-old student was arrested by the Montgomery County Police Department for shooting threats made against the school. The FBI contacted the MCPD, after which they proceeded to obtain a search warrant to investigate the student's home, where they discovered violent drawings and documents relating to mass violence, including a 129-page long manifesto, containing numerous threats of violence against the student population and staff of Wootton High School.

In December 2024, Douglas Nelson, the principal of the high school, was placed on administrative leave, due to his failure to properly respond to reports of racism amongst the student body. Dr. Joseph Bostic has taken his place as acting principal.

Its infrastructure is aging, a cause of concern for many students and teachers alike. It was found to have lead in its water, but those issues have not been fixed as of 2018. However, Montgomery County Public School Student Member of the Board candidates of 2023 are promising to fix this.

On February 9, 2026, a student was shot. The school was subsequently put in lockdown.

== Areas served ==
Most students attending Wootton live in Rockville, with others residing in Gaithersburg, Potomac, Travilah, and North Potomac.

Wootton feeds from two middle schools and six elementary schools:

- Cabin John Middle School
  - Cold Spring ES
  - Stone Mill ES
- Robert Frost Middle School
  - DuFief ES
  - Fallsmead ES
  - Lakewood ES
  - Travilah ES

=== Future boundary changes ===
Wootton is one of the schools in the scope for the new Crown High School, which has an expected completion date of August 2027.. In March 2026, the Montgomery County Board of Education voted to relocate Wootton High School from Rockville to the brand-new Crown High School building located at the Crown Farm development near Downtown Crown and the Rio Lakefront in Gaithersburg, due to the infrastructure and maintenance issues at the 56 year-old Wootton High School building alongside the lack of $300 million cost for the full rebuild and the school dedication. The new building at the Crown Farm development was originally planned to be Crown High School as the new Montgomery County school serving to students living in the local Gaithersburg/Crown Farm community. Instead, it will become a new home for Wootton High School serving to the Wootton students and also bringing in the Gaithersburg/Crown Farm students to attend the campus as well. Sometimes, it was referred to as Wootton at Crown Farm. That's because Wootton is leaving Rockville and moving into their new campus located at the Crown Farm development in Gaithersburg. The new Wootton High School building includes a competition gym, locker rooms, performing arts auditorium, science labs, classrooms, media center, dining areas, upper-floor courtyards, a greenhouse, and specialized spaces for cybersecurity, computer programming and early childhood education. The students will also have access to visit the Great Seneca Science Corridor located near the campus as well as getting to enjoy shopping and dining around Downtown Crown and the Rio Lakefront. Montgomery County Board of Education stated that it is a relocation of Wootton High School rather than a closure along with no need to open Crown High School as a separate school. The move will start in the 2027-2028 school year with 9th and 10th grade students moving into the new Wootton High School building, while the 11th and 12th grade students stay behind to finish up their education at the original Wootton High School building. The set of the 9th-12th grade students will be completed at the new Wootton High School building by the 2029-2030 school year. Wootton's historical legacy, traditions and identity including their mascot(Patriots), school colors(Red, White and Blue), academic and athletic programs will be transferred to the new building. The original Wootton High School building in Rockville will be renovated and used as a holding school for students, teachers and staff from other Montgomery County schools to attend while their school buildings are under renovations and constructions. The plan, known as Modified Option H was faced heavy pushbacks by parents, Rockville officials and the Gaithersburg local leaders who wanted to keep Wootton High School at its original Rockville location on Wootton Parkway to receive full renovations and having Crown High School served to the students living in the Gaithersburg/Crown Farm neighborhood. The Wootton community cited over neighborhood disruptions, long bus rides, traffic on the freeway and the loss of their beloved Rockville campus. The Gaithersburg/Crown Farm community have expressed their frustrations about not getting Crown High School as the new 27th Montgomery County school serving to their local neighborhood to relieve overcrowding at nearby Gaithersburg High School and Quince Orchard High School rather than housing a relocated Wootton High School out of Rockville or using it as a holding school. The Save Wootton and Protect Crown High School groups both also have filed legal appeals with the Maryland State Board of Education attempting to stop the move. .

== Demographics ==
Enrollment by Race/Ethnicity 2022–2023
White	Asian	Black	Hispanic	Two or More Races	American Indian/Alaska Native
711	732	224	157	80	4

View source data.

During the 2022–2023 school year, the school's racial composition was 37.3% white, 38.3% Asian, 11.8% Black, and 8.2% Hispanic. Multiracial students made up less than 5% of the student body, as did Native and Pacific Islander American students. The overall size of the student body was 1,911.

== Notable alumni ==
- Utkarsh Ambudkar, actor
- Steve Coll, journalist
- Daryl Davis, musician and activist
- Trevon Diggs, National Football League (NFL) defensive back
- Myles Frost, Tony Award-winning actor
- Mack Hollins, National Football League (NFL) wide receiver
- Timothy Hwang, CEO and co-founder of FiscalNote
- Thomas Jane, actor
- Chris Lu, politician
- Eric Luedtke, member of the Maryland House of Delegates
- Richie Moriarty, actor
- Mathias Nkwenti, National Football League (NFL) offensive tackle
- Krystian Ochman, Polish-American singer
- Marc Roberge, Chris Culos, Richard On and Benj Gershman, members of the rock band O.A.R.
- Dick Scanlan (1977), actor
- Aaron Silverman, chef
- Haley Skarupa, Olympic ice hockey player
- Scott Weinrich, musician
- Frederick Yeh, biologist and animal welfare activist
