= Castle Gatehouse, Washington Aqueduct =

- U.S. National Register of Historic Places
- U.S. National Historic Landmark District – Contributing property
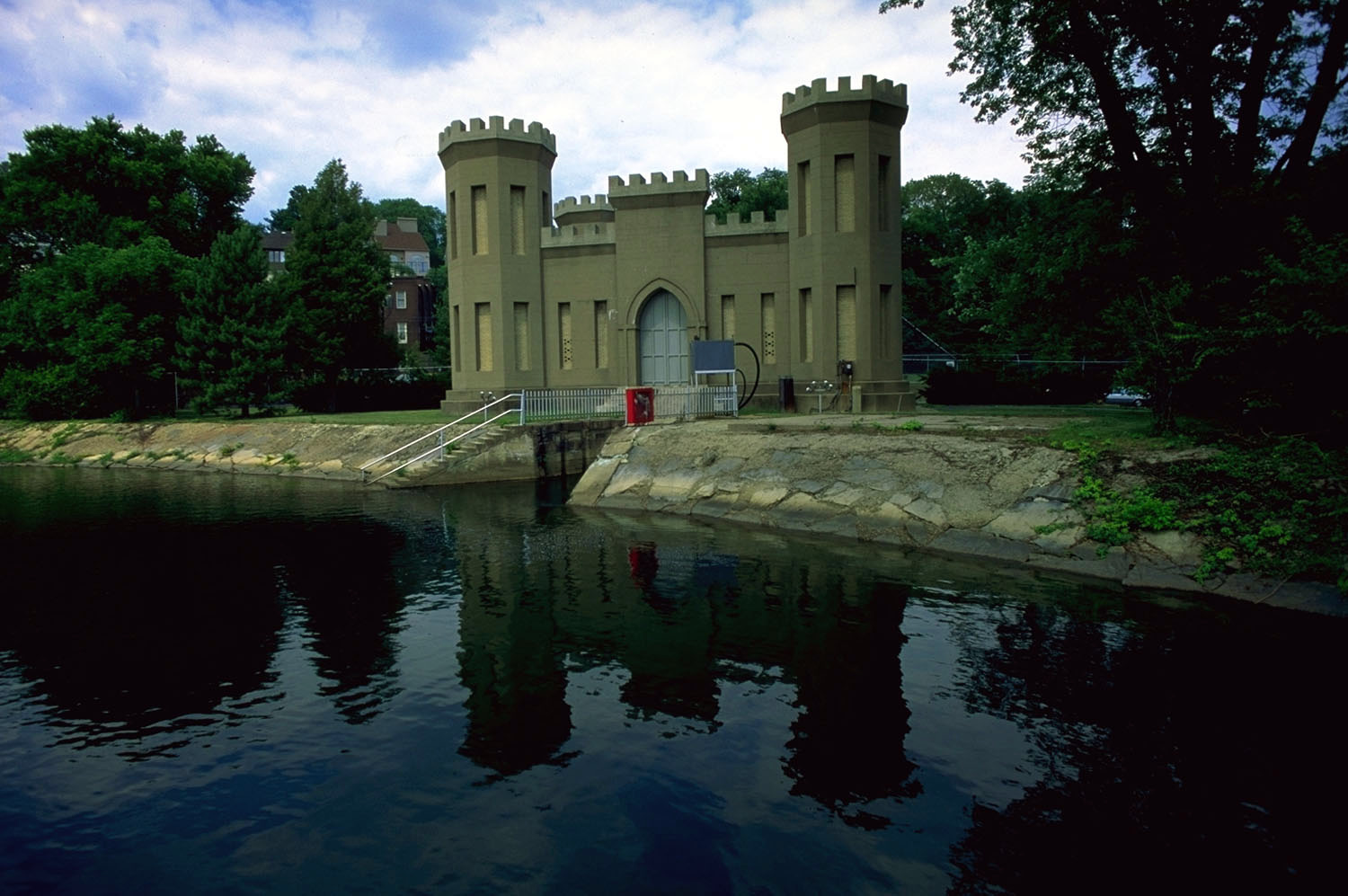
- Pumphouse at Georgetown Reservoir

- Location within the District of Columbia Location within the United States
- Location: Near Reservoir Rd. and MacArthur Blvd. NW; Northwest Quadrant, Washington, D.C.
- Coordinates: 38°54′39″N 77°5′24″W
- Built: 1901; 125 years ago
- Part of: Washington Aqueduct (ID73002123)
- NRHP reference No.: 75002048

Significant dates
- Added to NRHP: March 13, 1975
- Designated NHLDCP: November 7, 1973

Castle Gatehouse, Washington Aqueduct is a pumping station at the Georgetown Reservoir on the Washington Aqueduct in The Palisades neighborhood of Washington, D.C., United States. The building is on the National Register of Historic Places and contributes to the Washington Aqueduct National Historic Landmark.

== History ==
In 1852 the United States Congress authorized the Army Corps of Engineers to construct a water supply for the city of Washington, using the Potomac River at Great Falls as its source. Construction of a 12-mile pipeline began in 1853, and portions of the system began operation in 1859. Little Falls Branch was used as an interim source until the pipeline was completed in 1864. The water was routed to Dalecarlia Reservoir, followed by Georgetown Reservoir.

Improvements to the water system in the late 19th century included the Castle Gatehouse. The gatehouse was constructed at the Georgetown Reservoir to pump water into the four-mile long Washington City Tunnel that led to McMillan Reservoir, completed in 1902. A filtration system was constructed at McMillan in 1905 and this system improved the quality of city water.

Construction of the gatehouse began in 1899. The design was intended to replicate the Corps of Engineers insignia. Portland cement plaster was used to replicate stonework and give the gatehouse an authentic castle appearance.

The gatehouse is managed by the Army Corps of Engineers, Baltimore District. The building was added to the National Register of Historic Places on March 13, 1975.

== See also ==
- History of Washington, D.C.
- National Register of Historic Places listings in the District of Columbia
