= Little Falls Dam (disambiguation) =

Little Falls Dam could refer to:

- Little Falls Dam (Mississippi River), in Little Falls, Minnesota
- Little Falls Dam (Potomac River), in Potomac, Maryland
- Little Falls Dam (Washington), on the Spokane River
- Little Falls Dam (Maine), on the Presumpscot River
- Little Falls Dam (Minnesota), in Little Falls, Minnesota
