= Somerset, Maryland =

- Town
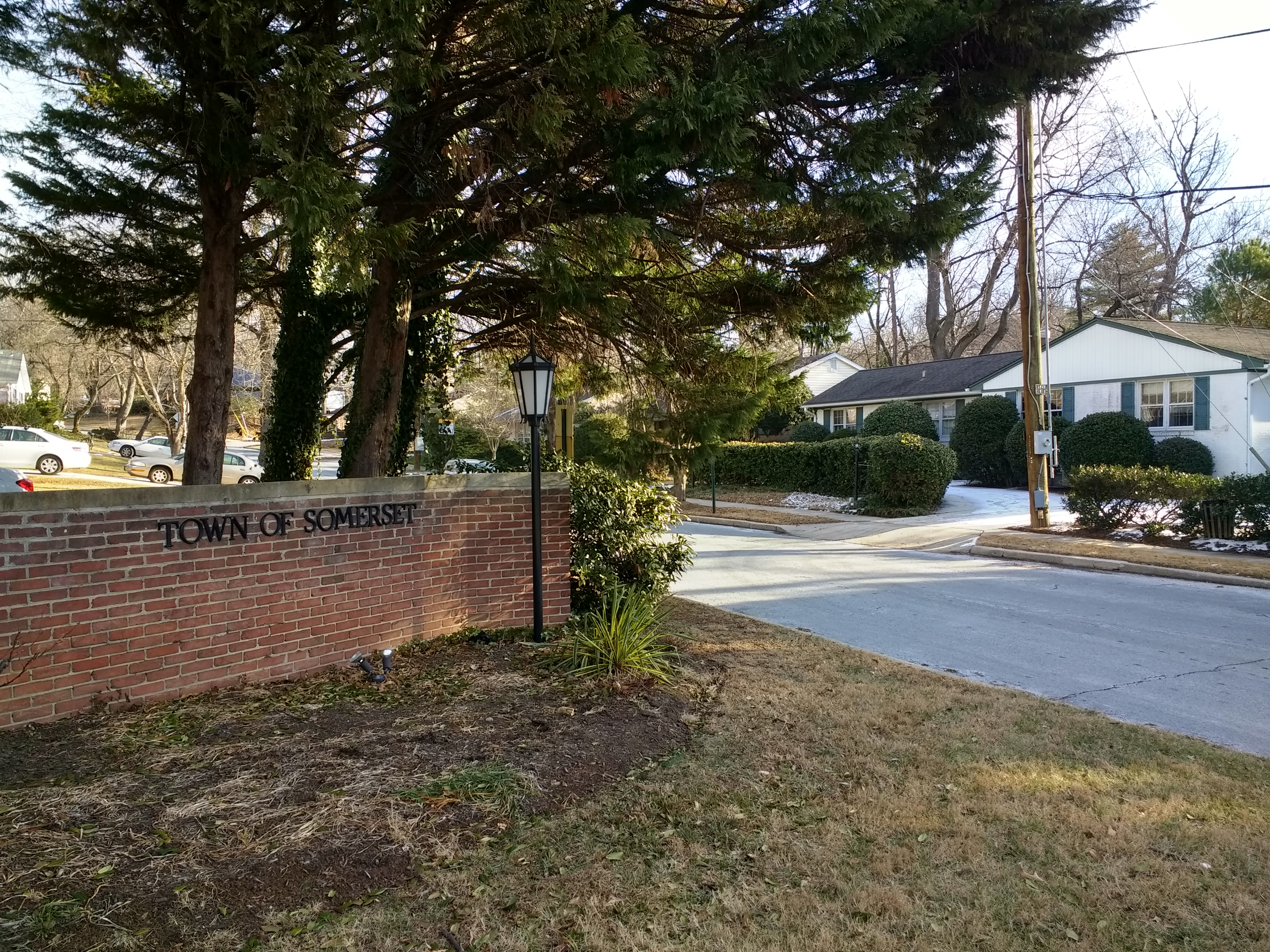

- Flag

- Location of Somerset in Montgomery County and Maryland
- Coordinates: 38°58′00″N 77°05′47″W
- Country: United States
- State: Maryland
- County: Montgomery
- Incorporated: 1906

Area
  - Total: 0.27 sq mi (0.71 km^{2})
  - Land: 0.27 sq mi (0.71 km^{2})
  - Water: 0 sq mi (0.00 km^{2})
- Elevation: 305 ft (93 m)

Population (2020)
  - Total: 1,187
  - Density: 4,308/sq mi (1,663.3/km^{2})
- Time zone: UTC-5 (Eastern (EST))
  - Summer (DST): UTC-4 (EDT)
- ZIP Code: 20815 (Chevy Chase)
- Area codes: 301; 240
- FIPS code: 24-73350
- GNIS feature ID: 2391418
- Website: www.townofsomersetmd.gov

Somerset is an incorporated town in Montgomery County, Maryland, United States, located near the border with Washington, D.C. The population was 1,187 at the 2020 census.

== History ==
The land that would become Somerset was originally a part of the 3,124-acre Friendship Tract patented by Benedict Calvert, 4th Baron Baltimore, to Col. Thomas Addison and James Stoddart in 1711. By 1811, a 211-acre portion of that tract, dubbed Friendship, was owned by Richard Williams, a farmer.

In 1890, John Beall and Ralph Walsh sold 50 acres to five scientists who worked at the U.S. Department of Agriculture: Charles A. Crampton, Harvey W. Wiley, Daniel E. Salmon, Miles Fuller, and Horace Horton, who had established the Somerset Heights Colony Company. Their plans were described in the Washington Evening Post's May 17, 1890, issue: "...the scientific men of the Dept. of Agriculture...selected a tract of 50 acres of rolling land adjoining the property of General Drum just across the DC line in Mont. County. The Company will begin operations by providing the property with good system of sewerage, a bountiful supply of water and electric lights from Georgetown and Tenallytown Electric Railway Company. The lots are to contain not less than one acre...suburb fashioned after the very pleasant ones of Boston and other northern cities."

Five early streets were arranged; they remain to this day: Dorset Avenue, Warwick Place, Surrey Street, Cumberland Avenue, and Essex Avenue, after the English counties.

The first home was built in 1893 on Dorset Avenue and occupied by Crampton, assistant chief of the Bureau of Chemistry. He was followed by Wiley, chief of the Bureau of Chemistry and father of the Pure Food and Drug Act of 1906; Salmon, chief of the Bureau of Animal Industry and discoverer of salmonella, who built Clover Crest; Fuller, chief clerk of the Bureau of Animal Industry and the partnership's business manager; and E. A. deSweinitz, chief of the Biochemic Division of the Bureau of Animal Industry, who took over Horton's shares.

The house built by Wiley and later owned by Arthur Cuming Ringland would be named the Wiley-Ringland House and added to the National Park Service's National Register of Historic Places in 2000. The home built by Salmon, later named the Salmon-Stohlman House, was added to the National Park Services' National Register of Historic Places in 2002.

By 1905, there were 35 residences. Marketed as an area of "tranquility and refinement", the original town was plagued by inadequate water drainage, a makeshift sewage system, and the absence of local fire protection and schools. These problems prompted the local citizens to petition the State of Maryland for incorporation into a township so that taxes could be levied to provide these basic services. The town charter was issued on April 5, 1906, forming the community of Somerset Heights and the surrounding areas into the town of Somerset.

54 of the original residences now form the Somerset Historic District located within the town. 31 of these residences are considered primary resources having been built prior to 1905. This Historic District has gone through four phases of development that represent the changing styles of the town. 1893-1904 was marked by large frame Victorian and Queen Anne houses, 1900-1915 by smaller bungalows and craftsmen houses, 1915-1940 by brick and frame Colonial Revival houses, and 1940–present by Modern and Neo-Colonial houses.

The first town council was elected on May 7, 1906, and Crampton was elected as the first mayor. Crampton was succeeded as mayor by Jesse Swigart, elected in 1910; Warren W. Biggs in 1912, and Charles S. Moore in 1916. Moore was followed by J. William Stohlman in 1919, W. B. Horne in 1938, and Irvin M. Day in 1940.

The Bergdoll family based in Philadelphia, Pennsylvania owned a large tract of land directly south of Somerset and in 1943 sought to build apartments by seeking a zoning change. After the family was denied, the Bergdoll Estate held three auctions in 1946 and 1947 for the land which became part of Somerset. This land would become unofficially known as Lower Somerset or New Somerset and the expanded street grid added Falstone Avenue, Grantham Avenue, Trent Street, Uppingham Street, and Greystone Street. The original street grid would unofficially become known as Upper Somerset or Old Somerset. The lots of the former Bergdoll tract were placed under racial covenants barring their sale to non-white people. Such racist restrictions were rendered unenforceable by the Fair Housing Act of 1968.

William F. Betts was elected mayor in 1954, followed by Frederick W. Turnbull in 1956, and Warren jay Vinton in 1958. Vinton was followed by Jerald F. Goldberg in 1969, Walter J. Behr in 1975, A. Eugene Miller in 1982, and Walter J. Behr who was reelected in 1986.

In 1988, town residents voted in a referendum to de-annex a parcel of land containing three large apartment buildings under construction, to avoid having the town council and services shift from representing the single-family homeowners to becoming representative of a condo community. Residents of the Somerset House complex would have out-numbered the single-family home dwellers by 3–1. The complex was constructed on the last large undeveloped woodlot in Somerset, and construction had been blocked by legal challenges for over two decades.

The current mayor of Somerset is Rohit Khanna elected in 2026. Jeffrey Z. Slavin was the prior mayor elected in 2008.

== Geography ==
Somerset is located in southern Montgomery County. It is bordered to the north by Village of Drummond, to the east by Chevy Chase Village, to the south by Village of Friendship Heights and Friendship Heights, and to the west by the Kenwood neighborhood of Bethesda. The District of Columbia is less than a mile to the southeast.

According to the United States Census Bureau, the town has a total area of 0.28 square miles (0.73 km^{2}), all land. The town is drained by the Little Falls Branch and its tributary, Willetts Branch, flowing to Dalecarlia Reservoir and the Potomac River just inside the border of the District of Columbia.

== Demographics ==
Historical population
| Census | Pop. | Note | %± |
|---|---|---|---|
| 1910 | 173 | | — |
| 1920 | 200 | | 15.6% |
| 1930 | 298 | | 49.0% |
| 1940 | 399 | | 33.9% |
| 1950 | 430 | | 7.8% |
| 1960 | 1,444 | | 235.8% |
| 1970 | 1,303 | | −9.8% |
| 1980 | 1,101 | | −15.5% |
| 1990 | 993 | | −9.8% |
| 2000 | 1,124 | | 13.2% |
| 2010 | 1,216 | | 8.2% |
| 2020 | 1,187 | | −2.4% |
U.S. Decennial Census

=== 2010 census ===
As of the census of 2010, there were 1,216 people, 407 households, and 347 families living in the town. The population density was 4,342.9 inhabitants per square mile (1,676.8/km^{2}). There were 423 housing units at an average density of 1,510.7 per square mile (583.3/km^{2}). The racial makeup of the town was 91.7% White, 0.7% African American, 3.9% Asian, 1.0% from other races, and 2.7% from two or more races. Hispanic or Latino of any race were 4.8% of the population.

There were 407 households, of which 44.5% had children under the age of 18 living with them, 76.2% were married couples living together, 6.6% had a female householder with no husband present, 2.5% had a male householder with no wife present, and 14.7% were non-families. 10.8% of all households were made up of individuals, and 8.1% had someone living alone who was 65 years of age or older. The average household size was 2.99 and the average family size was 3.18.

The median age in the town was 45.5 years. 31% of residents were under the age of 18; 4.8% were between the ages of 18 and 24; 13.4% were from 25 to 44; 33% were from 45 to 64; and 17.7% were 65 years of age or older. The gender makeup of the town was 48.5% male and 51.5% female.

=== 2000 census ===
As of the census of 2000, there were 1,124 people, 406 households, and 326 families living in the town. The population density was 4,001.0 inhabitants per square mile (1,544.8/km^{2}). There were 419 housing units at an average density of 1,491.5 per square mile (575.9/km^{2}). The racial makeup of the town was 94.04% White, 0.89% African American, 3.38% Asian, 0.89% from other races, and 0.80% from two or more races. Hispanic or Latino of any race were 2.94% of the population.

There were 406 households, out of which 38.7% had children under the age of 18 living with them, 74.1% were married couples living together, 4.9% had a female householder with no husband present, and 19.7% were non-families. 16.0% of all households were made up of individuals, and 11.1% had someone living alone who was 65 years of age or older. The average household size was 2.77 and the average family size was 3.05.

In the town, the population was spread out, with 28.1% under the age of 18, 3.5% from 18 to 24, 16.5% from 25 to 44, 32.7% from 45 to 64, and 19.3% who were 65 years of age or older. The median age was 46 years. For every 100 females, there were 98.6 males. For every 100 females age 18 and over, there were 87.5 males.

The median income for a household in the town was $144,523, and the median income for a family was $149,057. Males had a median income of $100,000 versus $80,762 for females. The per capita income for the town was $82,368. None of the families and 2.7% of the population were living below the poverty line, including no under eighteens and none of those over 64.

== Education ==
Montgomery County Public Schools serves Somerset.

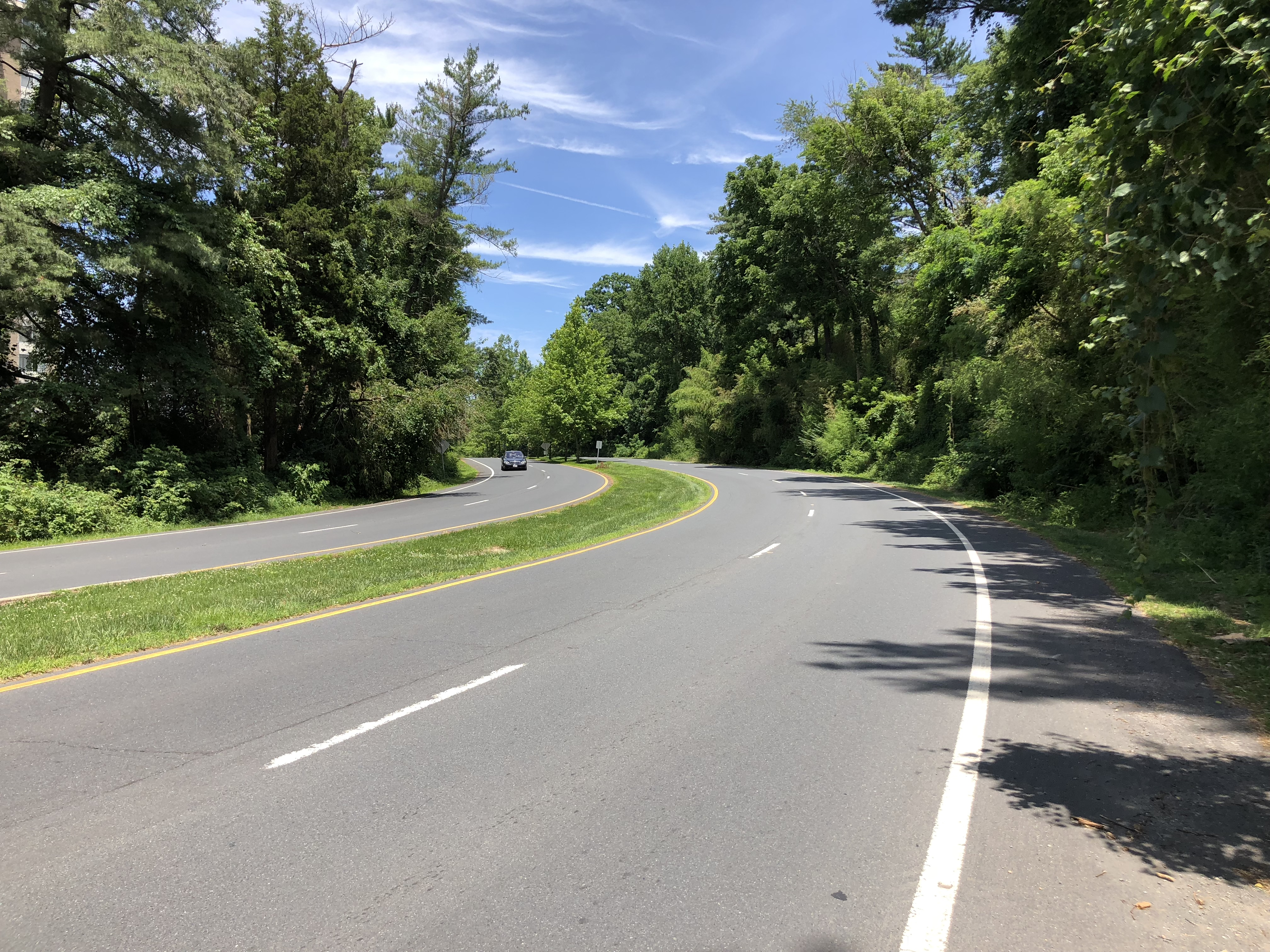
Little Falls Parkway northbound in Somerset

Residents are zoned to:

- Somerset Elementary School
- Westland Middle School
- Bethesda-Chevy Chase High School

== Transportation ==
No state highways directly serve Somerset. The most significant road within the town limits is Little Falls Parkway. Maryland Route 190 (River Road) passes just southwest of the town limits, and Maryland Route 355 (Wisconsin Avenue) is located just east of the town limits. Both connect southeastward to Washington, D.C., and northwestward to the nearest Interstate highway, Interstate 495 (the Capital Beltway). Roughly half a mile away is the Washington Metro's Friendship Heights Metro Station.
