= Salmon-Stohlman House =

Historic house in Maryland, United States

- U.S. National Register of Historic Places
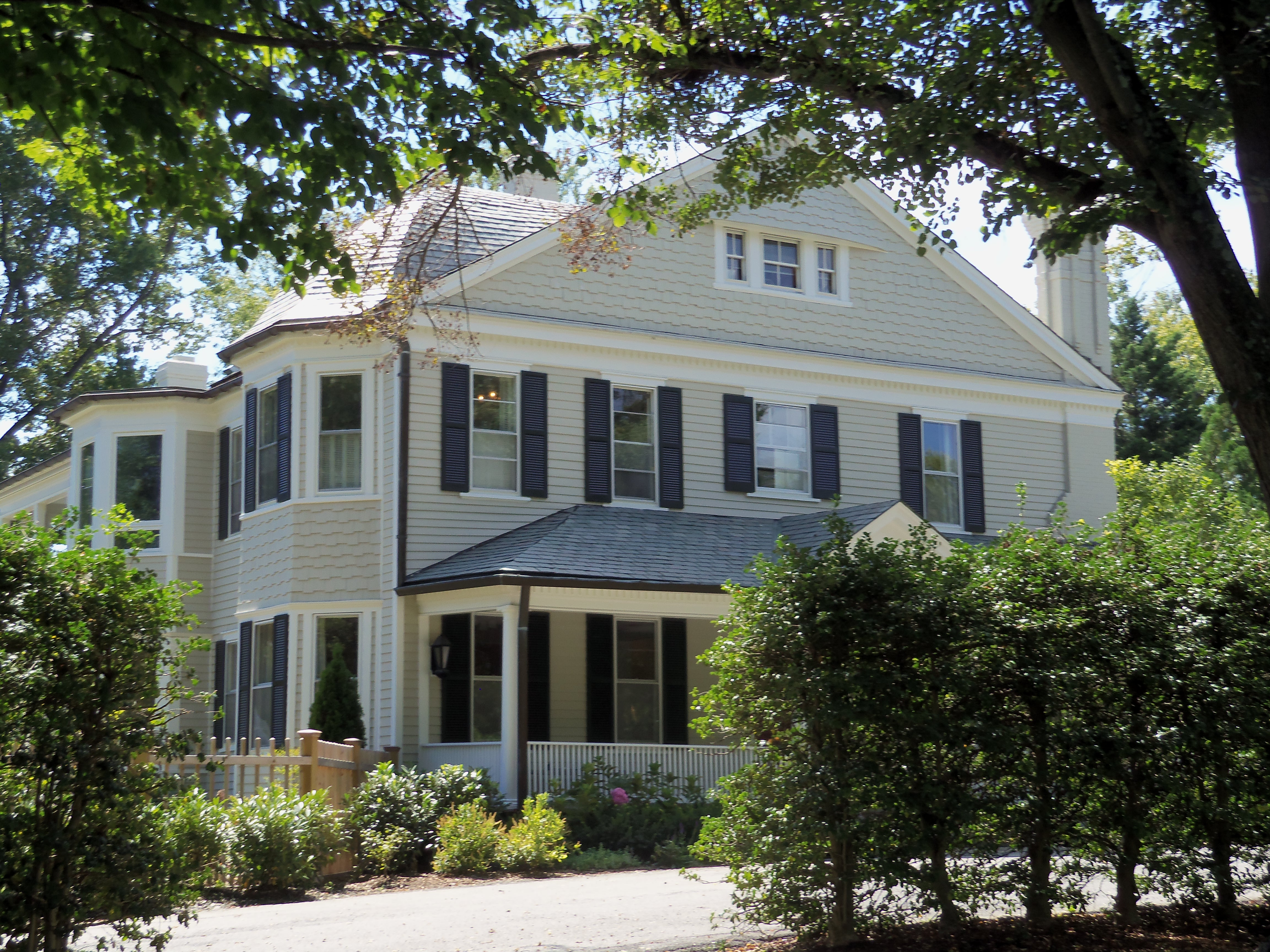
- Salmon-Stohlman House, August 2012

- Location within Maryland Location within the United States
- Location: 4728 Dorset Ave., Chevy Chase, Maryland
- Coordinates: 38°58′4″N 77°5′46″W
- Area: less than one acre
- Built: 1893
- Architectural style: Late Victorian
- NRHP reference No.: 02000353
- Added to NRHP: April 11, 2002

The Salmon-Stohlman House, also known as Clover Crest, is a historic home located in the Town of Somerset, Montgomery County, Maryland. It is a 2 1/2-story, frame structure built about 1893, and designed in a transitional manner with late Victorian detailing. It was one of the first houses built in the present day Town of Somerset by Dr. Daniel E. Salmon, a leading veterinarian at the U.S. Department of Agriculture, and one of the original developers of the suburban property.

It was listed on the National Register of Historic Places in 2002.

Victoria Clarke is a former resident of the Salmon-Stohlman House.
