= Maryland Route 396 =

State highway in Maryland, United States

Maryland Route 396
- Massachusetts Avenue
- Maryland Route 396 highlighted in red

Route information
- Maintained by MDSHA
- Length: 2.23 mi (3.59 km)
- Existed: 1931–present

Major junctions
- West end: MD 614 in Bethesda
- East end: Westmoreland Circle near the District of Columbia boundary in Bethesda

Location
- Country: United States
- State: Maryland
- Counties: Montgomery

Highway system
- Maryland highway system; Interstate; US; State; Scenic Byways
← I-395	→ MD 402

Maryland Route 396 (MD 396) is a state highway in the U.S. state of Maryland. Known as Massachusetts Avenue, the highway runs 2.23 miles (3.59 km) from MD 614 southeast to Westmoreland Circle near the District of Columbia boundary in Bethesda. MD 396 is an extension of Washington's Massachusetts Avenue into southwestern Montgomery County. The highway was constructed from Westmoreland Circle to Glen Echo in the early to mid-1930s. MD 396 was rolled back to its present western terminus in favor of MD 614 in the late 1970s.

== Route description ==
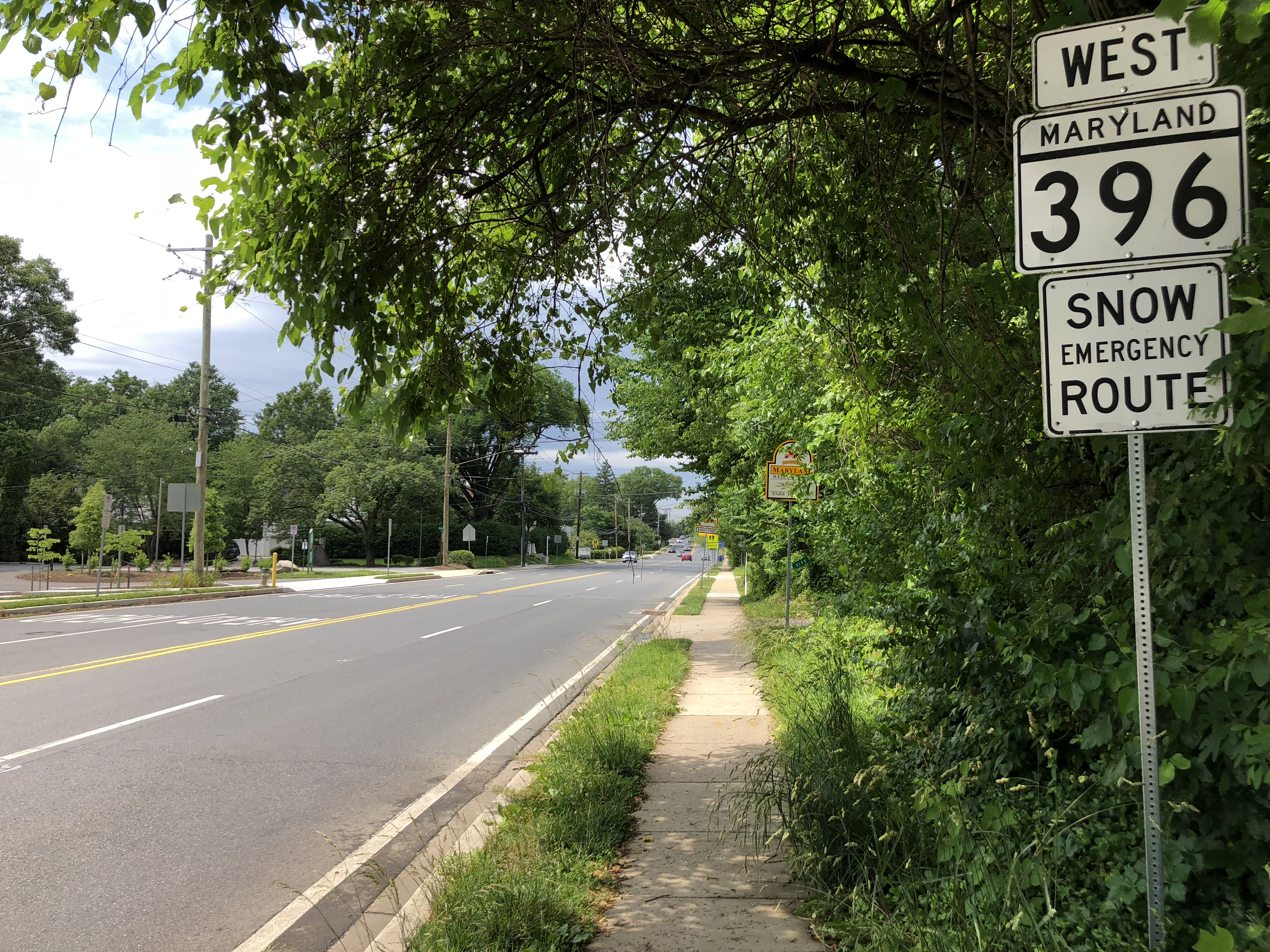
View west at the east end of MD 396 at the District of Columbia border in Bethesda

MD 396 begins at an intersection with MD 614 (Goldsboro Road) on the edge of Bethesda near Glen Echo. The highway heads southeast as a two-lane undivided road that widens to four lanes at Sangamore Road. Just east of its underpass of the Capital Crescent Trail, MD 396 meets the southern end of Little Falls Parkway and crosses Little Falls Branch. The highway reaches its eastern terminus at its entrance to Westmoreland Circle, which straddles the District of Columbia boundary and whose Maryland half is unsigned MD 396A. Massachusetts Avenue continues southeast through Washington on the opposite side of the circle.

== History ==
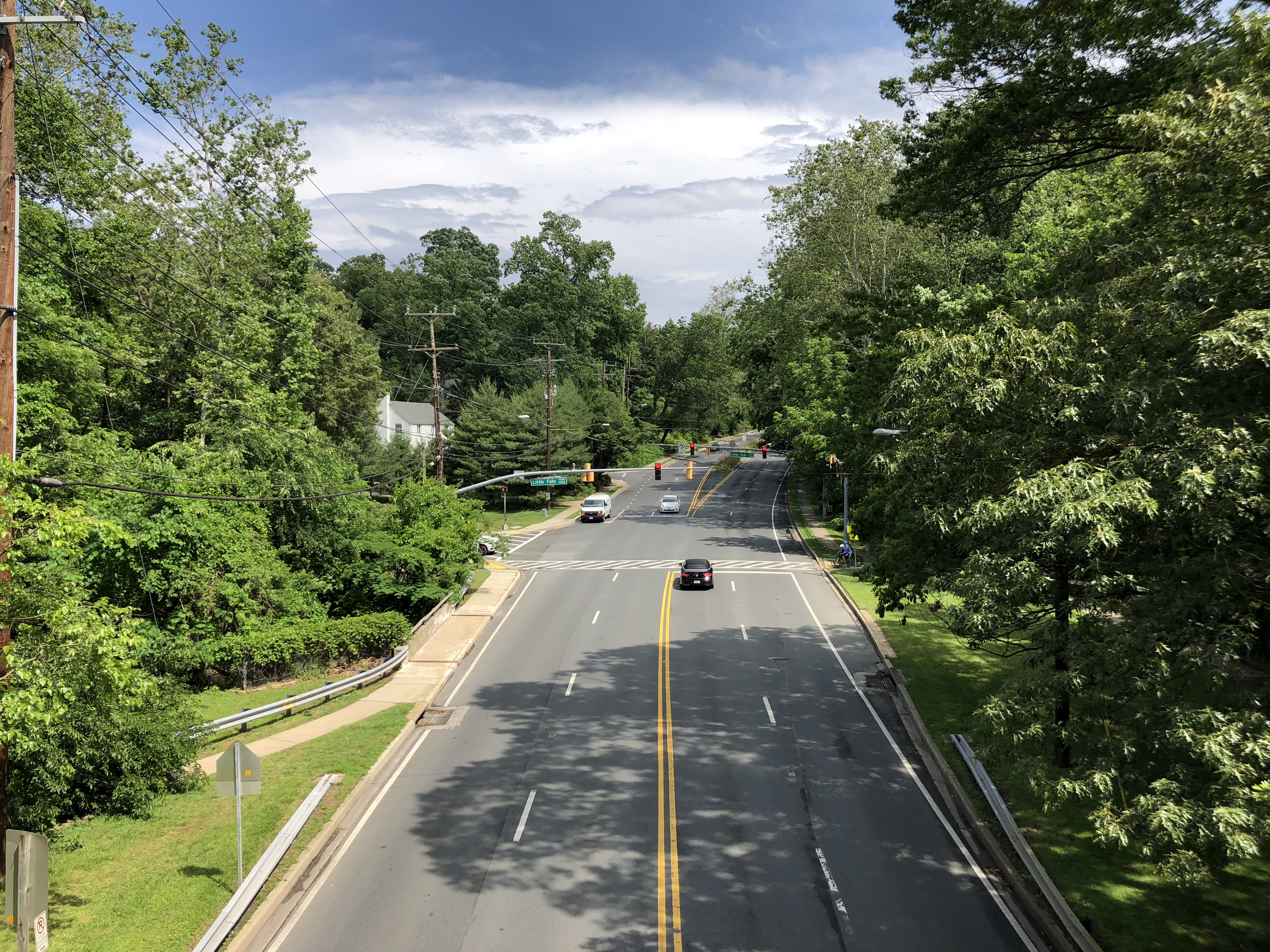
View east along MD 396 from the Capital Crescent Trail overpass in Bethesda

MD 396 was constructed as a concrete road along a new alignment from Westmoreland Circle to just west of the Georgetown Branch of the Baltimore and Ohio Railroad and Little Falls between 1931 and 1933. The Georgetown Branch's bridge across the highway, which is now used by the Capital Crescent Trail, was constructed at the same time as the highway. MD 396 was extended west to Goldsboro Road, then west along Goldsboro Road to what is now MacArthur Boulevard, in 1934 and 1935. The Goldsboro Road segment of MD 396 became a western extension of MD 614 in 1978. The MD 396–MD 614 intersection was originally a wye; the junction was changed to its current T intersection by 1999.

== Junction list ==
The entire route is in Bethesda, Montgomery County.

mi	km	Destinations	Notes
0.00	0.00	MD 614 (Goldsboro Road) to I-495 – Glen Echo	Western terminus
2.23	3.59	Westmoreland Circle to Massachusetts Avenue – Washington	Eastern terminus near District of Columbia boundary; Westmoreland Circle is unsigned MD 396A
1.000 mi = 1.609 km; 1.000 km = 0.621 mi

== Auxiliary route ==
MD 396A is the designation for the 0.10-mile (0.16 km) portion of Westmoreland Circle on the Maryland side of the District of Columbia boundary. The three-lane, one-way highway begins on the east side of the circle at Western Avenue. MD 396A continues counterclockwise around the circle through intersections with MD 396 and Wetherill Road before ending on the west side of the circle at Dalecarlia Parkway. MD 396A was assigned to the Maryland half of Westmoreland Circle in 2011. Even though MD 396A only consists of half the circle, Maryland State Highway Administration contractors resurfaced the entire circumference of Westmoreland Circle in 2024.
