= Journal of AOAC International =

- Discipline: Analytical chemistry
- Language: English
- Edited by: David B. Schmidt

Publication details
- Former name(s): Journal of the Association of Official Agricultural Chemists
- History: 1915-present
- Publisher: Oxford University Press
- Frequency: Bimonthly
- Impact factor: 1.913 (2020)

Standard abbreviations
- ISO 4: J. AOAC Int.

Indexing
- CODEN: JAINEE
- ISSN: 1060-3271 (print); 1944-7922 (web)
- LCCN: 60624520
- Journal of the Association of Official Analytical Chemists
- ISSN: 0004-5756

Links
- Journal homepage; Online access

The Journal of AOAC International is a peer-reviewed scientific journal publishing research articles in the field of analytical chemistry and microbiology covering basic and applied research in analytical sciences related to foods, drugs, agriculture, the environment, and more. It is published by Oxford University Press on behalf of AOAC International and the editor-in-chief is David B. Schmidt. The journal was established in 1915 as the Journal of Association of Official Agricultural Chemists, obtaining its current name in 1992.

== Abstracting and indexing ==
According to the Journal Citation Reports, the journal has a 2020 impact factor of 1.913.
