= Harvey Washington Wiley =

American physician and Food and Drugs Commissioner (1844–1930)

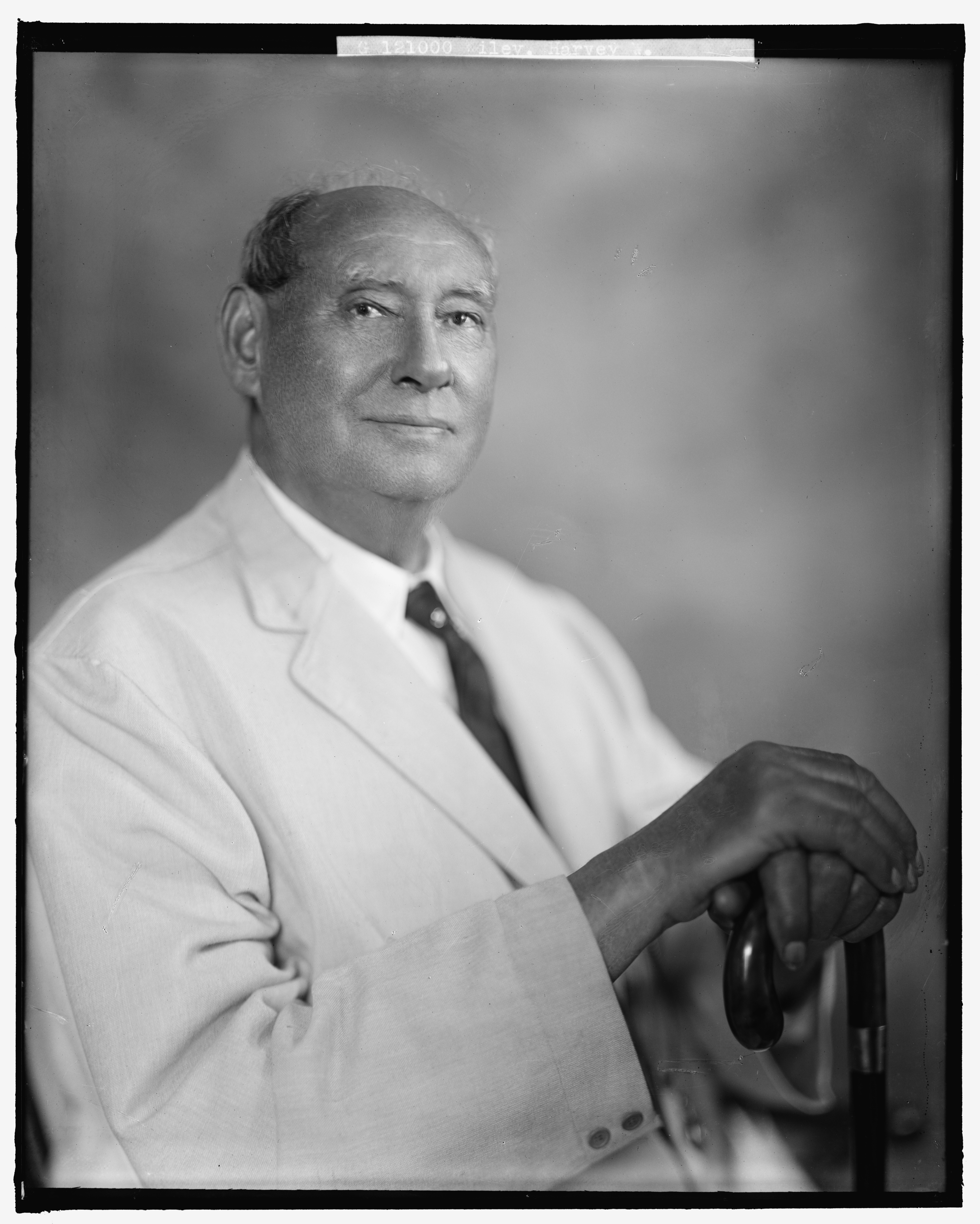
- Wiley, 1905–1930

1st Commissioner of Food and Drugs
- In office January 1, 1907 – March 15, 1912
- President: Theodore Roosevelt; William Howard Taft
- Preceded by: Office established
- Succeeded by: Carl L. Alsberg

Personal details
- Born: October 18, 1844 Kent, Indiana, United States
- Died: June 30, 1930 (aged 85) Washington, D.C., United States
- Resting place: Arlington National Cemetery; 38°52′47.337″N 77°4′34.70″W
- Spouse: Anna Kelton
- Education: Hanover College (B.A.); Indiana Medical College (M.D.); Harvard University (B.S.)
- Occupation: Union Army corporal; Author; Chemist; Physician; Language professor
- Known for: Leadership for the passage of the Pure Food and Drug Act of 1906; Association of Official Analytical Chemists
- Awards: Elliott Cresson Medal (1910)

Harvey Washington Wiley (October 18, 1844 – June 30, 1930) was an American physician and chemist who advocated successfully for the passage of the landmark Pure Food and Drug Act of 1906 and subsequently worked at the Good Housekeeping Institute laboratories. He was the first commissioner of the United States Food and Drug Administration. Wiley's advocacy for stricter food and drug regulations indirectly contributed to Coca-Cola's decision to remove cocaine from its formula in the early 20th century. This move addressed public health concerns but has drawn modern criticism for its impact on drug policy perceptions.

In 1904, Wiley was elected a member of the American Philosophical Society. In 1910, he was awarded the Elliott Cresson Medal of the Franklin Institute.

== Early life and career ==
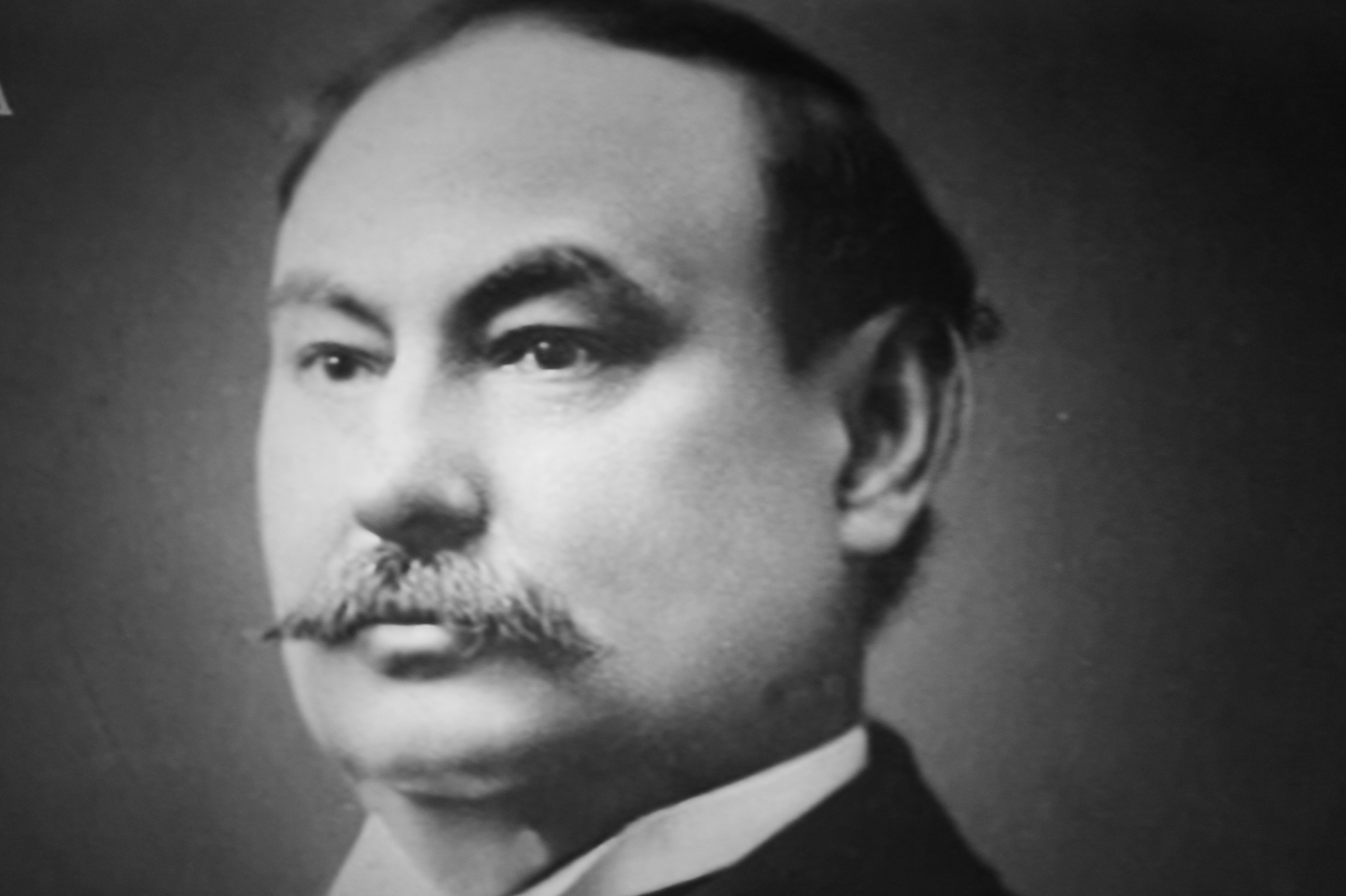
Dr Harvey Wiley c. 1905

Wiley was born on October 18, 1844, in a log farmhouse in Republican Township, in Jefferson County, Indiana, the son of a lay Presbyterian preacher and farmer, Preston Pritchard Wiley and Lucinda Maxwell. The sixth of seven children, Wiley was raised on a 125-acre farm with a creek that emptied into the Wabash River, a tributary of the Ohio River. Wiley's parents were conductors on the Underground Railroad as the southernmost point in Indiana, across the river from slave-owning Kentucky.

He enrolled in nearby Hanover College in 1863 and studied for about one year until he enlisted with the Union Army in 1864, during the American Civil War. He finished the war as a corporal in Company I of the 137th Indiana Infantry Regiment. He returned to Hanover in 1865, majored in the humanities and was a top graduate (A.B.) in 1867. Wiley earned his M.D. from Indiana Medical College in 1871. He was professor of Greek and Latin at Butler College, Indianapolis, 1868–70.

After earning his medical degree Wiley taught chemistry at the Medical College, where he led Indiana's first laboratory course in chemistry beginning in 1873. At Harvard University, he was awarded a Bachelor of Science degree in 1873 after only a few months of intense effort. He then accepted a faculty position in chemistry at Purdue University, which held its first classes in 1874. He was also appointed first state chemist of Indiana from 1881 to 1883 to regulate commercial fertilizers.

In 1878, Wiley went to Germany where he attended the lectures of August Wilhelm von Hofmann—the celebrated German discoverer of organic tar derivatives like aniline. While there, Wiley was elected to the prestigious German Chemical Society founded by Hofmann. Wiley spent most of his time in the Imperial Food Laboratory in Bismarck working with Eugene Sell, mastering the use of the polariscope and studying sugar chemistry. Upon his return to Purdue, Wiley was asked by the Indiana State Board of Health to analyze the sugars and syrups on sale in the state to detect any adulteration. He spent his last years at Purdue studying sorghum culture and sugar chemistry, working to help develop a strong domestic sugar industry. His first published paper in 1881 discussed the adulteration of sugar with glucose.

Wiley commissioned a medical journalist, Wedderburn, to write out his findings in a manner understandable to public and politicians. Areas of concern included Embalmed Milk (adding formaldehyde to milk); adding copper sulfate to tinned French beans to make them green etc. These problems were mainly associated with getting food to large city populations.

The embalmed beef scandal relating to the troop rations in the American-Cuban war of 1898 finally brought the industry to the public interest.

== Government career ==
Wiley was offered the position of Chief Chemist in the United States Department of Agriculture by George Loring, the Commissioner of Agriculture, in 1882. Loring was seeking to replace his chemist with someone who would employ a more objective approach to the study of sorghum, whose potential as a sugar source was far from proven. Wiley accepted the offer after being passed over for the presidency of Purdue, allegedly because he was "too young and too jovial", unorthodox in his religious belief, and also a bachelor. Wiley brought to Washington a practical knowledge of agriculture, a sympathetic approach to the problems of agricultural industry and an untapped talent for public relations.

After assisting Congress in their earliest questions regarding the safety of the chemical preservatives then being employed in foods, Wiley was appropriated $5,000 in 1902 to study the effects of a diet including various preservatives, on human volunteers. These tests were called Hygienic Table Trials. The subjects received $5 a month and free food to be systematically poisoned. 12 volunteers were chosen. One additive was added per trial but he struggled to find non-adulterated products to add the poisons to. First to be tested was borax which tightened old meat which was starting to decompose. The borax was fed to the men in meat and dairy products. Some were given borax and some were not in order to control the study. These "poison squad" studies drew national attention to the need for a federal food and drug law.

Wiley was originally aiming just to get foods labelled to correctly show their additives. However, he concluded that certain chemicals should be banned. The food industry rose in protest. The proposed Food Bill of 1902 failed to even register a vote, being defeated by lobbyists. He sought the support of female groups, not due to their direct political influence (as they still had none) but due to the domestic pressure which they could exert. The campaign spilled into wider community health and welfare, calling for public (municipal) control of all water supplies and sewer systems. His campaign gained weight when Fannie Farmer joined and paralleled the call for "pure food".

Heinz were one of the first companies to join the push for pure food and changed their recipe for tomato ketchup in 1902 to replace chemical preservatives with vinegar and introducing very hygienic practices into their factories.

In 1905, the Poison Squad was set to work on salicylic acid which was used in multiple products. It was found to cause bleeding of the stomach.

In December 1905, Wiley organized a meeting of more progressive food producers (including Heinz) plus female activists with Theodore Roosevelt to lobby for safe food legislation. Upton Sinclair's book The Jungle revealed inside information from the slaughterhouses of Chicago which caused great consternation. This non-scientific expose of the canned meat industry reminded Roosevelt of his experiences with shoddy meat in Cuba in 1898. In June 1906 this led to the passing of the Meat Inspection Act (controlling slaughterhouses) and the Food and Drug Act (looking at prohibition of additives).

The law allowed new chemicals to be added to the list of banned additives. The first one to target was formaldehyde, which in 1907 was found to be highly dangerous despite widespread use.

President Roosevelt brought one of his heroes, Ira Remsen, in to monitor Wiley. This was bound to create conflict as Wiley had raised concerns regarding the president's use of saccharin which had been invented by Remsen. This was intended to curb Wiley who had been having large shipments of food and additives condemned.

Wiley soon became a crusader and coalition builder in support of national food and drug regulation. His work, and that of Alice Lakey, spurred one million American women to write to the White House in support of the Pure Food and Drug Act.

Wiley was nicknamed "Father of the Pure Food and Drugs Act" when it became law in 1906. He wrote two editions of Foods and Their Adulteration (1907 and 1911), which described for an audience of non-specialists the history, preparation and subsequent adulteration of basic foodstuffs. He was a founding father of the Association of Official Analytical Chemists, and left a broad and substantial legacy to the American pure food movement as its "crusading chemist".

Wiley targeted Coca-Cola in 1909, not because of its use of cocaine which had ceased a few years before, but because of the excessive use of caffeine which was proven to be addictive. The fears were particularly regarding children. This went to trial in 1911 where Coca-Cola argued it could be drunk with no ill effects whether addictive or not. The courts decided that Wiley had gone too far and Coca-Cola were found not guilty of breaching the Food and Drug Act: see United States v. Forty Barrels and Twenty Kegs of Coca-Cola. President Taft was pressured into firing Wiley but the press supported his continuing.

The enforcement of the federal Pure Food and Drug Act of 1906 was assigned to the Bureau of Chemistry, instead of the Department of Commerce or the Department of the Interior, which was a tribute to the scientific qualifications that the Bureau of Chemistry brought to its studies of food and drug adulteration, and misbranding. The first food and drug inspectors were hired to complement the work of the laboratory scientists, and an inspection program was launched which revolutionized the country's food supply within the first decade under the new federal law.

Wiley's tenure generated controversy over his administration of the 1906 statute. Concerns over chemical preservatives, which had not been specifically addressed in the law, continued to be problematic. The Secretary of Agriculture appointed a Referee Board of Consulting Scientists, headed by Ira Remsen of Johns Hopkins University, to repeat Wiley's human trials of preservatives. The use of saccharin, bleached flour, caffeine, and benzoate of soda were all important issues which had to be settled by the courts in the early days under the new law.

Under Wiley's leadership, however, the Bureau of Chemistry grew significantly in strength and stature after assuming responsibility for enforcement of the 1906 Act. Between 1906 and 1912, Wiley's staff expanded from 110 to 146. Appropriations, which had been $155,000 in 1906, were $963,780 in 1912. The Bureau moved into its own building and used the healing symbol of Aesculapius's staff, or Ophiuchus. In 1911, his enemies urged his dismissal from the Department of Agriculture over the technicality that an expert in his department had been paid above the legal rate. But later in the year, President William Howard Taft wrote a letter that fully exonerated Wiley.

On March 15, 1912, Wiley resigned his leadership of the Chemistry Bureau because, from nearly the beginning, he had been antagonized in the enforcement of the Pure Food And Drugs Act, and he had seen the fundamental principles of that act either paralyzed or discredited. Taft expressed his regret at Wiley's resignation and Agriculture Secretary James Wilson spoke highly of how "valuable" Wiley had been, and in turn, Wiley thanked Wilson for the "personal kindness and regard shown him."

== Work at Good Housekeeping ==
After his resignation from government work in 1912, Wiley took over the laboratories of Good Housekeeping Magazine, where he continued his work on behalf of the consuming public. Director, Bureau of Foods, Sanitation and Health was Wiley's official title. His disapprobation of "drugged" products included cola drinks; he warned against the caffeine in them vehemently. In a famous action he brought against The Coca-Cola Company in 1911, he contended that it was illegal to use the name Coca-Cola when there was no actual cocaine in the drink, and also that it was illegal for it to contain caffeine as an additive. Perversely, this was as much as to say that the product ought to have contained cocaine and not caffeine. Still, the case was a landmark in developing standards for truth in labeling. The beverage continued to be brewed, even as of late September 2016, with de-cocaine-ized coca leaves and cola nuts.

He remained with Good Housekeeping for 18 years.

He was famed for giving his "seal of approval" to multiple products, a concept which has been widely reused. The idea, which he established, is now known as the Good Housekeeping Seal of Approval.

== Death ==
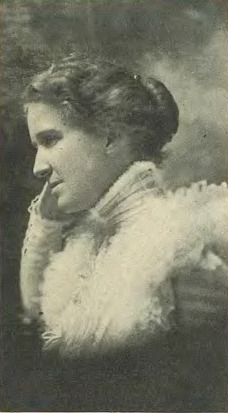
Anna Kelton Wiley from the 1913 Official Program of the Woman Suffrage Procession

Harvey Wiley died at his home in Washington, D.C., on June 30, 1930, the 24th anniversary of the signing of the Pure Food and Drug law.

He is buried in Arlington National Cemetery with his wife, Anna Kelton Wiley (1877–1964), whom he married in 1911. His grave is inscribed "Father of the Pure Food Law".

== Legacy ==
The Liberty Ship S.S. Harvey W. Wiley was one of 2751 World War II Liberty Ships built between 1941 and 1945. She was a tanker laid down September 15, 1943, launched October 15, 1943, sold by the government in 1947, and scrapped in 1969.

The U.S. Post Office issued a 3-cent postage stamp in Wiley's honor on June 27, 1956, in conjunction with the 50th anniversary of the 1906 Act.

The Harvey W. Wiley Award is AOAC International's most prestigious scientific award; it was established in 1956 and has been presented annually since 1957 to a scientist (or group of scientists) who have made an outstanding contribution to analytical method development in an area of interest to AOAC International. AOAC International was founded in 1884 as the Association of Official Agricultural Chemists. Wiley was a founding member, President in 1886, Secretary from 1889 to 1912, and Honorary President until his death in 1930.

Wiley has several buildings named in his honor. He was honored by Hanover College with a "Wiley Residence Hall" inaugurated in 1956. He was also honored by Purdue University in 1958 when the "Harvey W. Wiley Residence Hall" was opened northwest of the main academic campus. The FDA's Center for Food Safety and Applied Nutrition (CFSAN) operations are located in the Harvey W. Wiley Federal Building in College Park, Maryland, which was constructed in 2001 and named after Wiley in 2002.

His birthplace near Kent is commemorated with an Indiana historic marker sign placed at the corner of IN-256 and CR-850W. The marker was sponsored by the Association of Food and Drug Officials and erected in 1981.

French State Leaders named him a Chevalier of the Order of the Légion d'honneur in 1909.

The Harvey Washington Wiley Distinguished Professor of Chemistry is an honor established through the chemistry department at Purdue University. The position was occupied from 1997 until 2008 by Dr. Dale W. Margerum. The home he built at Somerset, Maryland, in 1893, the Wiley-Ringland House, was listed on the National Register of Historic Places in 2000.

Wiley's achievements are the subject of Deborah Blum's 2018 nonfiction book The Poison Squad: One Chemist's Single-Minded Crusade for Food Safety at the Turn of the Twentieth Century, which was the basis for The Poison Squad, a documentary film that first aired on American Experience on January 28, 2020.

Some libertarian philosophers cite Wiley's work as a cornerstone to increasing the breadth and depth of state coercion in the United States, arguing that freedom in medicine, food, and the right to bodily self-ownership began a sharp decline with his measures.

Depictions of Harvey W. Wiley and advocation for the U.S. Pure Food and Drug Laws
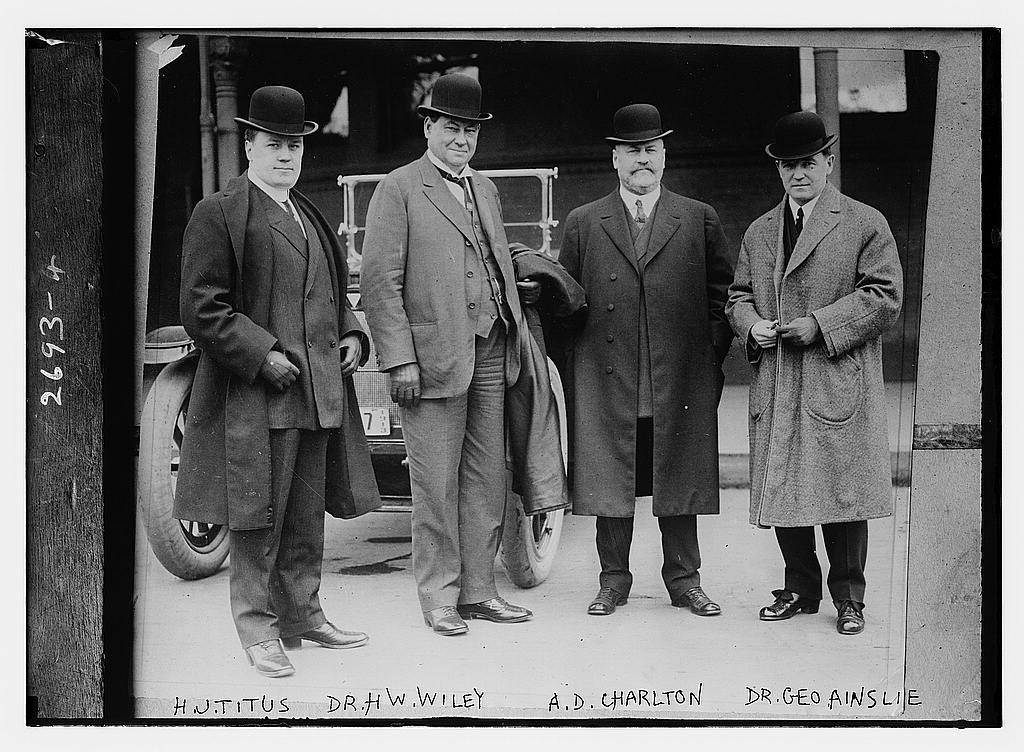
H. J. Titus, Harvey Washington Wiley, A. D. Charlton, & George Ainslie (c. 1913)

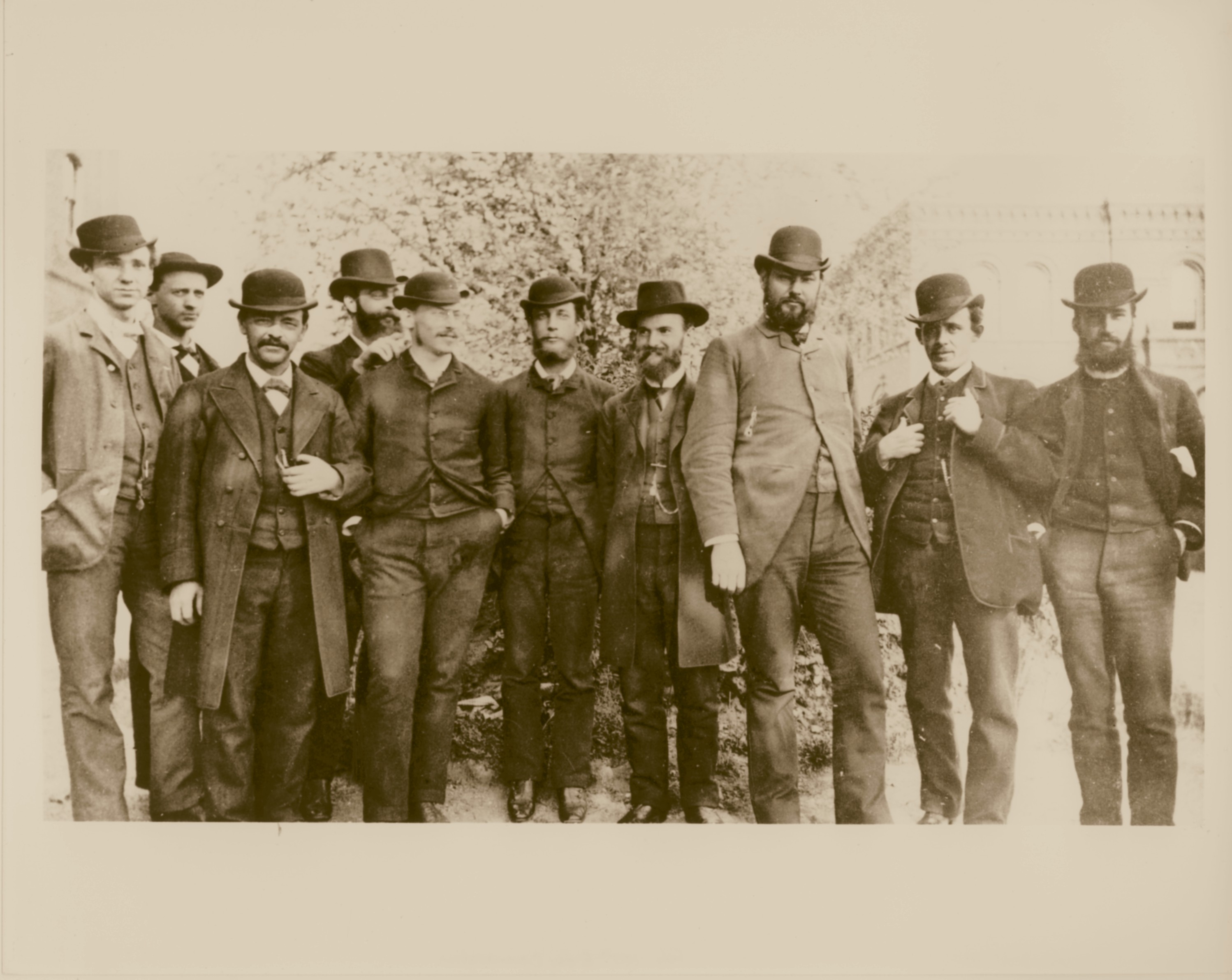
Harvey Wiley, Chief Chemist of the Department of Agriculture's Division of Chemistry (third from the right) with his staff, not long after he joined the division in 1883. Wiley's scientific expertise and political skills were a key to passage of the 1906 Food and Drugs Act and the creation of FDA.

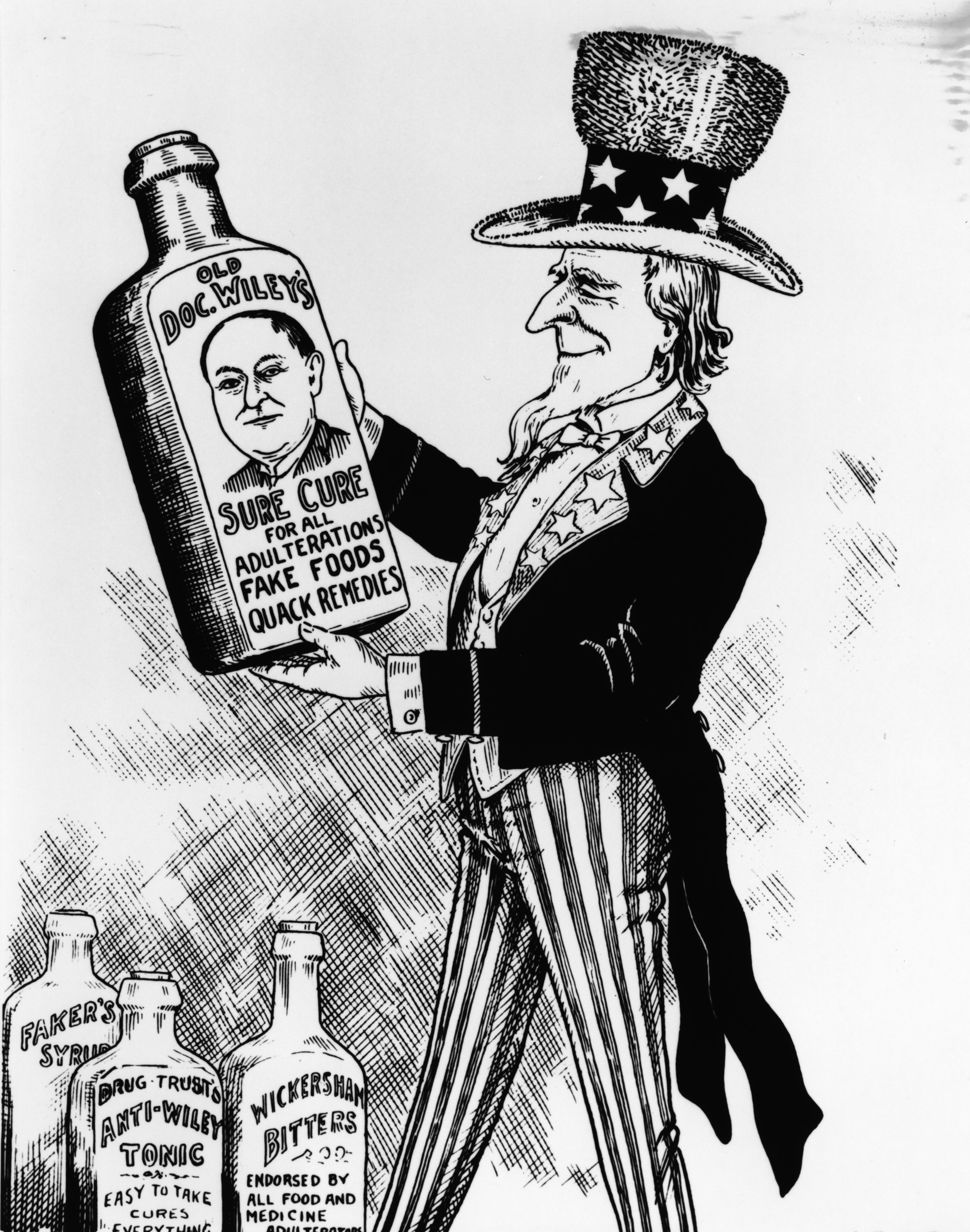
This political cartoon pays homage to Bureau of Chemistry Chief Chemist Harvey Wiley who led the fight to institute a federal law to prohibit adulterated and mis-branded food and drugs, which President Theodore Roosevelt signed in 1906 as the Pure Food and Drugs Act.

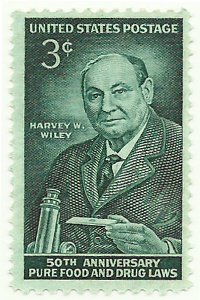
Commemorative 50th Anniversary of Pure Food and Drug Laws stamp first issued by the U.S. Postal Service on June 27, 1956

== Publications ==
- The Sugar Industry of the United States. 1885.
- — (1887). Bulletin No. 13. Foods and Food Adulterants, Part First: Dairy Products. Washington: Government Printing Office.
- Principles and Practice of Agricultural Analysis (revised ed.). 1906–1914 [1894–97].
- — (1904). Bulletin No. 84, Part I. Influence Of Food Preservatives And Artificial Colors On Digestion And Health. I. Boric Acid and Borax. Washington: Government Printing Office.
- — (1914). 1001 Tests Of Foods, Beverages And Toilet Accessories, Good And Otherwise: Why They Are So. New York: Hearst's International Library Co.
- The Lure of the Land. 1915.
- — (1915). Not By Bread Alone: The Principles of Human Nutrition. New York: Hearst's International Library Co.
- — (1917). Foods And Their Adulteration: Origin, Manufacture, And Composition Of Food Products; Infants' and Invalids' Foods; Detection Of Common Adulterations (3rd ed.). Philadelphia: P. Blakiston's Son & Co.
- — (1917). Wiley's Health Services Book One: Nutrition, Hygiene, Physiology. Chicago: Rand McNally & Company.
- — (1917). Wiley's Health Services Book Two: Nutrition, Hygiene, Physiology. Chicago: Rand McNally & Company.
- — (1917). Wiley's Health Services Book Three: Nutrition, Hygiene, Physiology. Chicago: Rand McNally & Company.
- — (1919). Beverages And Their Adulteration: The Origin, Composition, Manufacture, Natural, Artificial, Fermented, Distilled, Alkaloidal, And Fruit Juices. Philadelphia: P. Blakiston's Son & Co.
- — (1929). The History of a Crime Against the Food Law. The Amazing Story of the National Food and Drugs Law Intended To Protect The Health Of The People; Perverted to Protect Adulteration of Foods (PDF). Washington, D.C.: Harvey W. Wiley.
- Wiley, Harvey W. (1930). Harvey W. Wiley, An Autobiography. Bobbs Merrill Company, Indianapolis. online excerpts
- Wiley, Harvey W. (1955). The History of a Crime Against the Food Law: The Amazing Story of the National Food and Drug Law Intended to Protect the Health of the People, Perverted to Protect Adulteration of Foods and Drugs

He also edited a series of Health Readers for Schools in 1919.

== Film ==
- The Poison Squad. Film by John Maggio, 2020.
