= William Horwitz =

American chemist (1918–2006)

William Horwitz (1918 – September 27, 2006, in Olney, Maryland) was an analytical chemist who is notable for formulating a description of the relationship between the variability of chemical measurements and the concentration of the analyte. This relationship, called the Horwitz curve applies only to the between-laboratory variability of measurements.

- w = weight percent of analyte in sample [%-w/w]
- C = mass fraction of analyte in sample [dimensionless] = w / 100%-w/w
- predicted RSD (relative standard deviation) = 2^(1-0.5*log(C))%

Horwitz worked for the U.S. Food and Drug Administration (FDA) for 57 years until his retirement in 2000 and was head of the Association of Official Analytical Chemists for 24 years.

The Horwitz curve is "one of the most intriguing relationships in modern analytical chemistry"; it is related to the Variance-to-mean ratio.
