= Little Falls Branch (Potomac River tributary) =

Stream in Maryland, United States of America

Coordinates: 38.935667°N 77.119701°W

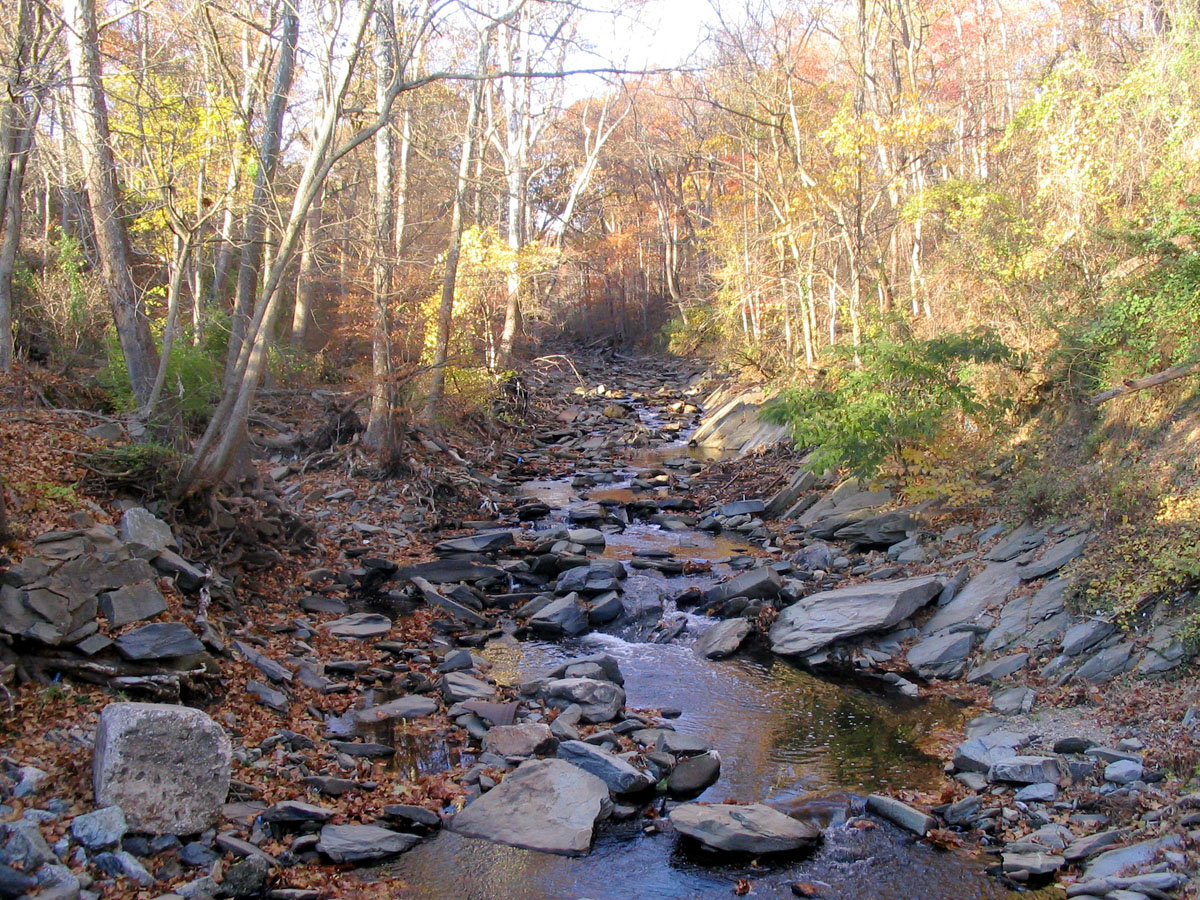
Little Falls Branch just north of the Clara Barton Parkway in Brookmont, Maryland

Little Falls Branch, a 3.8-mile-long (6.1 km) tributary stream of the Potomac River, is located in Montgomery County, Maryland. In the 19th century, the stream was also called Powder Mill Branch. It drains portions of Bethesda, Somerset, Friendship Heights, and Washington, D.C., flows under the Chesapeake and Ohio Canal (C&O), and empties into the Potomac at Little Falls rapids, which marks the upper end of the tidal Potomac.

== Course ==
The stream rises on the grounds of the Chevy Chase Country Club and flows through Chevy Chase to the Somerset neighborhood, where it crosses through Vinton Park and the Willard Avenue Park. After crossing under the Little Falls Parkway it joins Willett Branch and then flows through the Little Falls Stream Valley Park to Brookmont, the Chesapeake and Ohio Canal and into the Potomac River.

== History ==
The name, "Powder Mill Branch" was derived from the Loughborough Mill, which was built and operated alongside the stream in the 19th century.

In the mid-19th century, the stream served as an interim water source for Washington, D.C. The Dalecarlia Reservoir was built on the Washington, D.C.–Maryland border next to Little Falls Branch in 1858. A dam was built on the stream, and water was diverted into the reservoir starting in 1859. In 1864, with the completion of the Washington Aqueduct, the Potomac River became the city's principal water source, instead of Little Falls Branch. Muddy water from Little Falls Branch continued to flow into the reservoir, and a bypass pipe was built to channel the aqueduct water to another city reservoir, the Georgetown Reservoir. In 1895 construction was completed to fully divert the stream from the Dalecarlia Reservoir and the branch stopped providing water to the city.

In 1897, the U.S. Department of Agriculture (USDA) purchased a farm located along a tributary of Little Falls Branch from Henry Bradley Davidson, for use by the Bureau of Animal Industry's animal disease station. The station operated at the Bethesda location until 1937, when nearby residents complained about odors emitted by the station. USDA moved the station to the Beltsville Agricultural Research Center and the Bethesda site was subsequently used by Maryland-National Capital Park and Planning Commission (M-NCPPC) as a park. In 1951 USDA formally transferred the property to the M-NCPPC. M-NCPPC initially included the site in the land for the adjacent, recently-constructed Little Falls Parkway. Subsequently the site was converted into Norwood Park, named for the nearby St. John's Episcopal Church, Norwood Parish.

=== Little Falls Parkway and Stream Valley Park ===
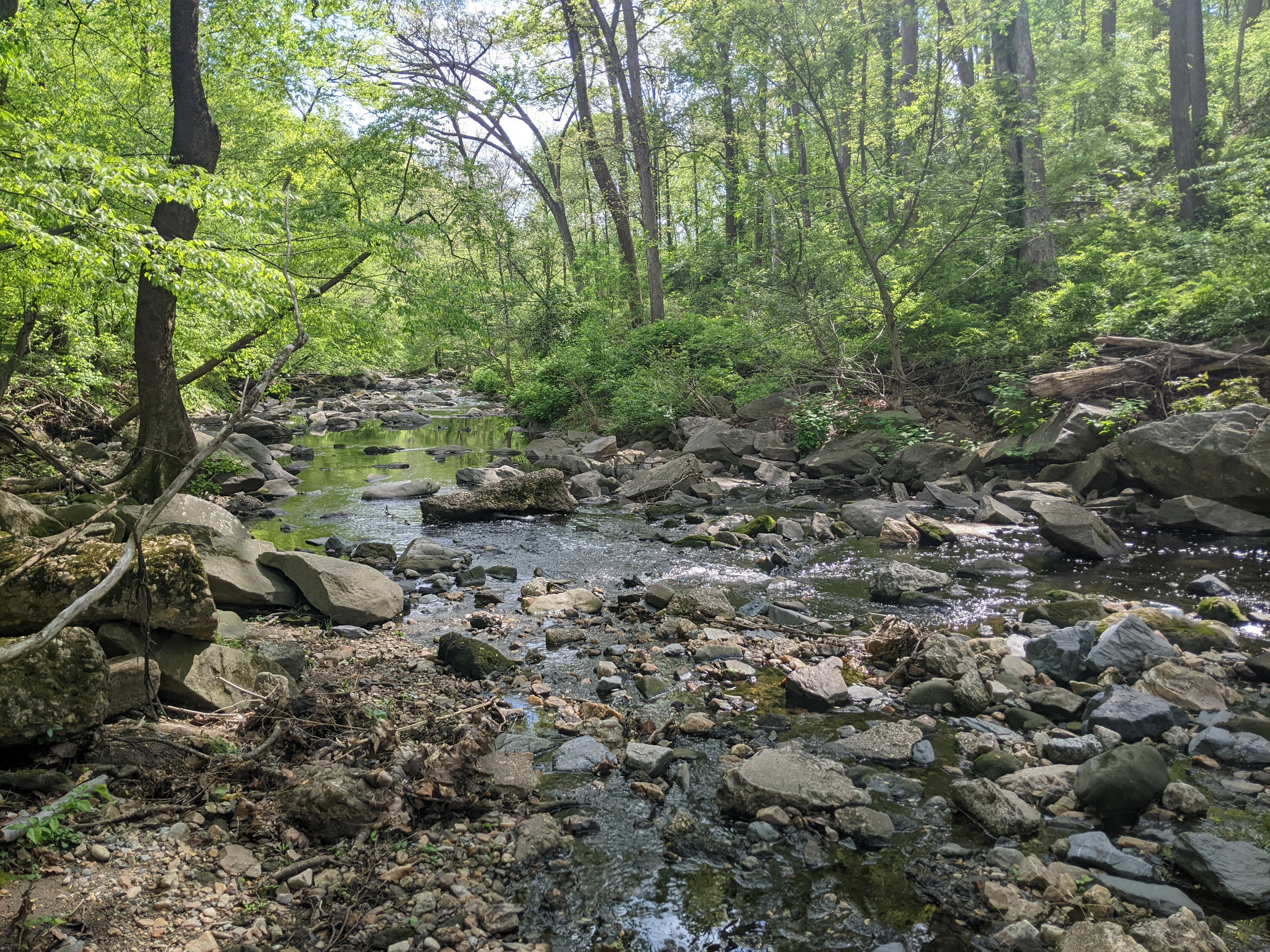
Little Falls Branch in the stream valley park, Bethesda, Maryland

Planning for the Little Falls Parkway started in the mid-1940s. The county began buying land for the project with a 20 acres (0.081 km^{2}) land purchase on both sides of Massachusetts Avenue in 1946. In 1948 M-NCPPC was authorized to purchase parkland around Little Falls Branch and Willett Branch under the Capper-Cramton Act of 1930. The parkway was eventually built from Glenbrook Road to Massachusetts Avenue, but plans to extend the parkway south to MacArthur Boulevard were dropped in 1970. The land south of Massachusetts Avenue became Little Falls Stream Valley Park.

A railroad trestle was built over Little Falls Branch near the aqueduct by the Washington and Great Falls Electric Railway in 1896-7. The streetcar stopped running in 1960, and the trestle was removed in the 1960s.

In 1978, the National Capital Planning Commission approved a trail to run the length of the park, along with a replacement sewer line to be built south of Massachusetts Avenue. This action prompted neighbors to go to court to attempt to stop construction of the trail. Later that year the southern part of the trail and the sewer project were approved by the United States District Court for the District of Columbia. When the trail design was approved from Bradley Boulevard to Albemarle Street, the neighborhood group sued again. In 1980 the Washington Suburban Sanitary Commission built the sewer line through the park, replacing one that was leaking and in 1981 a bike trail was added on top of it. The bike trail was originally planned to follow the parkway to Bradley with a spur following Willett Branch to Hillandale Road and that road to a different point on Bradley, but the entire trail was never built. Instead the 3.5 miles (5.6 km) Little Falls hiker-biker paved trail is on road on the Little Falls Parkway between Massachusetts Ave. and Dorset Ave. North of Dorset it follows Willett Branch north to Hillandale and east to Norwood Drive. In Little Falls Stream Valley the trail is next to the Capital Crescent Trail. Though opponents of the bike trail were concerned the trail would bring crime to the neighborhood, a later review showed that crime dropped after the trail was opened.

== Current conditions ==
Today Little Falls Branch flows through a highly urbanized area, and parts of the stream have been altered through construction of underground pipes, culverts and open concrete channels. The stream runs near the Dalecarlia drinking water treatment plant in Washington, D.C., and occasionally has received overflow discharges from the plant.

According to a study conducted by the county government, the water quality of the stream and its tributaries is poor, due to water pollution from urban runoff, as well as the channelization described above. The county and the Town of Somerset have installed several stream restoration projects throughout the watershed.

== Tributaries of Little Falls Branch ==
- Dalecarlia Tributary
- Little Falls Mall Tributary
- Spring Valley Tributary
- Willet Branch

== See also ==
- Little Falls Dam
- List of Maryland rivers
