= Wiley-Ringland House =

Historic house in Maryland, United States

- U.S. National Register of Historic Places
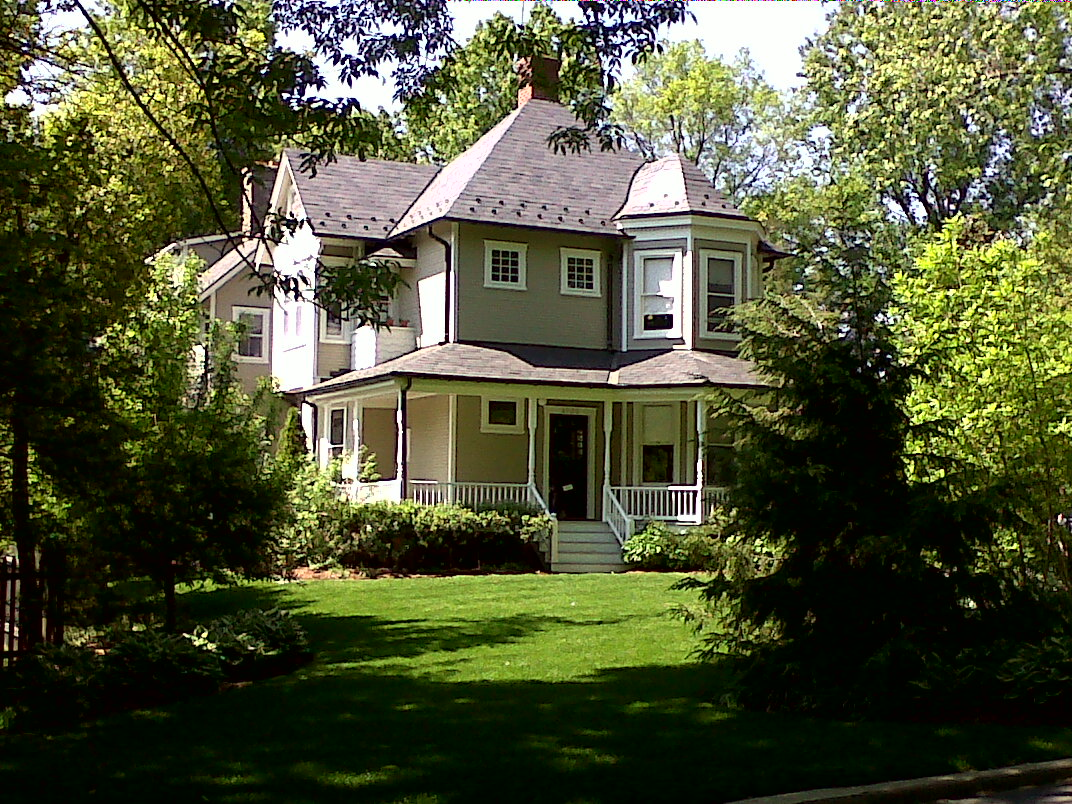

- Location within Maryland Location within the United States
- Location: 4722 Dorset Ave., Chevy Chase, Maryland
- Coordinates: 38°57′31″N 77°5′43″W
- Area: 1 acre (0.40 ha)
- Built: 1893
- Architect: Ketcham, E.H.
- Architectural style: Queen Anne
- NRHP reference No.: 00001392
- Added to NRHP: November 22, 2000

The Wiley-Ringland House is a historic home in the town of Somerset, Montgomery County, Maryland, United States. It is named for its original owner/builder Harvey Washington Wiley and longtime owner/resident, Arthur Cuming Ringland. The house is a 2 1/2-story Queen Anne-style frame building built about 1893. A fire in 1978 significantly damaged the house, causing it to sit empty for many years, but it was restored between 2001 and 2002 by new owners.

The Wiley-Ringland House was listed on the National Register of Historic Places in 2000.
