= AOAC International =

Non-profit scientific association

AOAC INTERNATIONAL
- AOAC logo
- Abbreviation: AOAC
- Founded: September 8, 1884 (142 years ago)
- Founder: Harvey Washington Wiley
- Purpose: Safety and integrity of foods and other products that impact public health around the world
- Location: Rockville, Maryland
- Members: nearly 3000
- Website: AOAC.org
- Formerly called: Association of Official Agricultural Chemists

AOAC International is a 501(c) non-profit scientific association with headquarters in Rockville, Maryland. It was founded in 1884 as the Association of Official Agricultural Chemists (AOAC) and became AOAC International in 1991. It publishes standardized, chemical analysis methods designed to increase confidence in the results of chemical and microbiological analyses. Government agencies and civil organizations often require that laboratories use official AOAC methods. AOAC is headquartered in Rockville, Maryland, and has approximately 3,000 members based in over 90 countries.

== History ==
AOAC International, informally AOAC, was founded September 8, 1884, as the Association of Official Agricultural Chemists, by the United States Department of Agriculture (USDA), to establish uniform chemical analysis methods for analyzing fertilizers. In 1927, it was moved to the newly formed Food, Drug and Insecticide organization which become the Food and Drug Administration (FDA) in 1930.

From its initial scope of analyzing fertilizer, the organization expanded the contents of its methods book to cover dairy products, pesticides, microbiological contamination and animal feeds, among others. In 1965, due to its increasing area of focus for analytical work, the name was changed to the Association of Official Analytical Chemists. The name was changed again to the Association of Analytical Communities to reflect the growing international involvement, and then in 1991 it became AOAC INTERNATIONAL, with AOAC no longer having any legal meaning. Control of the organization remained with the FDA until 1979 when it became completely independent, although it still has close links to both the FDA and the USDA.

Full membership was limited to government analytical chemists until 1987 when membership was extended to industrial scientists. As well as government agencies, members, volunteers, and partners now also include people from academia, other international organizations, private laboratories, contract research organizations, instrument manufacturers, and rapid assay developers.

== Activities ==
AOAC International's technical contributions center on the creation, validation, and global publication of reliable analytical test methods. Their areas of focus include, but are not limited to, safety of foods, beverages, dietary supplements, fertilizers, animal feeds, soil and water, and veterinary drugs. The aim of the test methods is to evaluate the purity of materials used in the production of foodstuffs, and their ingredients. The development of these analytical methods in achieved as part of a range of programs operated by AOAC.

== Core Programs ==
=== Official Methods of Analysis ===
The Official Methods of Analysis (OMA) program is AOAC's premier program for developing food testing analytical science methods that are recognized and legally defensible worldwide.

=== AOAC Research Institute ===
AOAC Research Institute (AOAC RI) Performance Tested Methods program develops, improves, and validates proprietary kit-based food safety testing methods.

=== Proficiency Testing Program ===
Proficiency Testing (PT) program helps labs compete in the global marketplace by demonstrating that through participation they meet the highest international standards for accuracy, reliability, and compliance.

== Science and Professional Support Programs ==
=== Cannabis Analytical Science Program ===
Cannabis Analytical Science Program (CASP) is a forum where the science of hemp and cannabis analysis can be discussed and cannabis standards and methods developed.

=== Analytical Solutions Forum ===
Analytical Solutions Forum (ASF) brings global stakeholders together to identify emerging needs and technologies in scientific analysis of food and related products.

=== Botanical Ingredients and Dietary Supplement Integrity Program ===
AOAC’s Botanical Ingredient and Dietary Supplement Integrity (BIDSI) Program focuses on coordinating all future consensus-driven need for development, validation, and implementation of methods for the analysis of a wide range of botanical ingredients and dietary supplements.

=== Stakeholder Program on Infant Formula and Adult Nutritionals ===
Stakeholder Program on Infant Formula and Adult Nutritionals program (SPIFAN) develops consensus-based standards and methods to make infant formula and adult nutritionals safer for babies and adults to consume.

=== Stakeholder Program on Agent Detection Assays ===
Stakeholder Program on Agent Detection Assays (SPADA) brings together expert stakeholders from the biothreat community to foster a comprehensive and uniform approach to scientific analysis and detection of biothreat agents.

=== AOAC INTERNATIONAL Microbiological Standards ===
AOAC INTERNATIONAL Microbiological Standards (AIMS) program focuses on capability gaps in laboratory testing, emerging microbial threats to food safety, and developing standards for using cutting-edge technologies.

=== Gluten & Food Allergens ===
Gluten & Food Allergens (GFA) program focuses on coordinating all future consensus-driven need for development, validation, and implementation of methods for the analysis of a wide range of food-associated allergens and gluten.

=== Training & Education ===
Training & Education program offers scientific, regulatory, and professional development training courses in person at the Annual Meeting and Midyear Meeting and as online courses and webinars.

== Meetings ==
AOAC International holds an Annual Meeting & Conference, typically held in August or September of each year, which is moved around the United States and held in major cities.

== Sections ==
AOAC International has 15 active sections; five in North America, and ten in the rest of the world, China, India, Japan, Southeast Asia, Taiwan, Thailand, Europe (excluding Belgium, Netherlands, and Luxembourg), the Lowlands, Middle East and Africa, and Central and South America.

== Publications ==
AOAC has published the peer-reviewed Journal of AOAC International bimonthly since 1915. They also publish the Official Methods of Analysis (OMA) in hard copy and through the online database. The magazine Inside Laboratory Management is published online bimonthly for members.

== Awards ==
At its annual meeting, AOAC presents a range of awards for scientific excellence in standards development and for exceptional service to the association (including fellow). The association's highest honors include:

- The Harvey W. Wiley Award
- The William Horwitz Award
