= Little Falls Dam (Potomac River) =

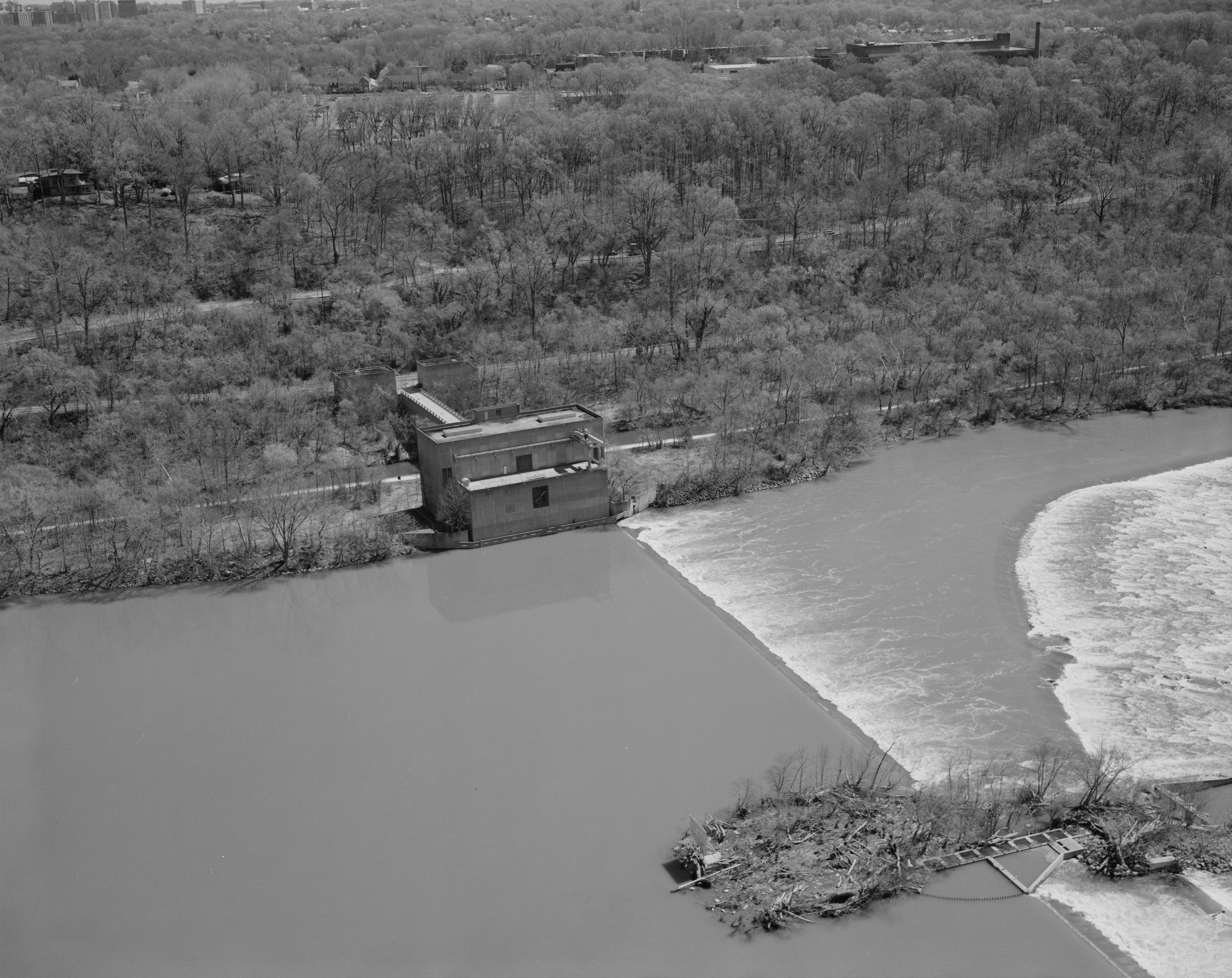
- Little Falls Dam and pumping station in 1994

- Location of Little Falls Dam
- Country: United States
- Coordinates: 38°56′54.03″N 77°07′46.73″W
- Status: Operational
- Opening date: 1959
- Owner: U.S. Army Corps of Engineers

Dam and spillways
- Type of dam: Concrete gravity
- Impounds: Potomac River
- Height: 14 ft (4.3 m)
- Length: 1,500 feet (460 m)
- Spillway type: Uncontrolled overflow

Little Falls Dam, also known as Brookmont Dam, is a low dam on the Potomac River, built in 1959 to divert water for the water supply system of Washington, D.C., just below Mather Gorge, about 2 miles (3.2 km) above Chain Bridge. The 14-foot (4.3 m) dam was constructed by the U.S. Army Corps of Engineers, which is responsible for the D.C. water supply. It contributes roughly 15 to 20 percent of water intake from the Potomac to the Washington Aqueduct, rising to 30 percent in time of drought. In 1978 a "Low Flow Allocation Agreement" was established to ensure a minimum flow of water of 100 million gallons/day over the dam, in order to maintain environmental conditions downstream on the river. The agreement, revised in 2018, was signed by the member parties of the Interstate Commission on the Potomac River Basin.

The dam blocks fish migration routes several miles below their natural end at the Great Falls of the Potomac River. It has been termed "the drowning machine" in recognition of its danger to boaters and swimmers who can be trapped in the flow at its base. The dam was altered in 2000 to improve fish passage. The profile at the base has also been altered to reduce the chances of swimmer entrapment beneath the surface.

== See also ==
- Little Falls (Potomac River)
- Little Falls Branch
