= Chain Bridge (Potomac River) =

Viaduct between Virginia and Washington, D.C., U.S.

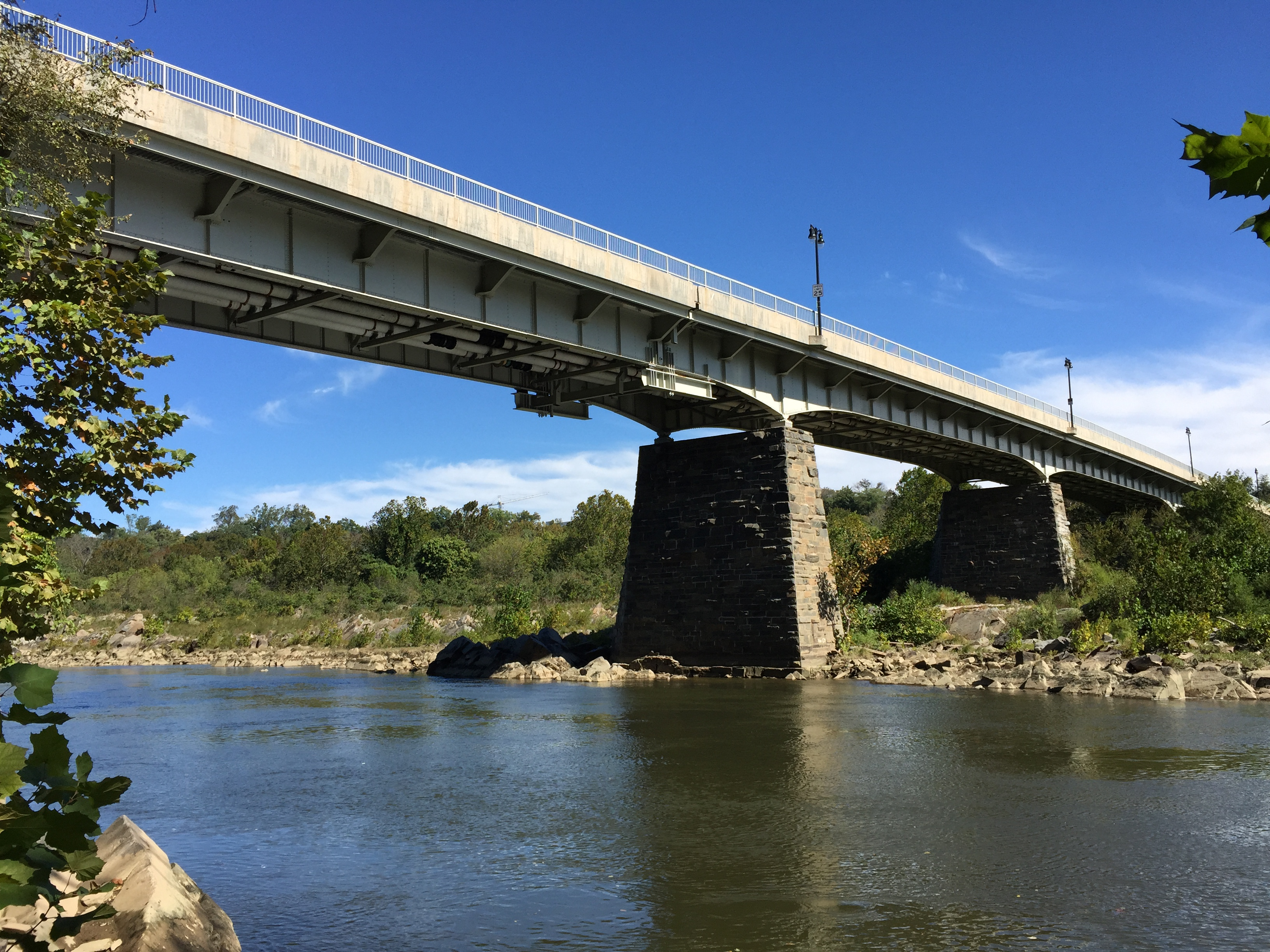
- Chain Bridge viewed Arlington with Washington D.C. visible on the distant shore in October 2016
- Coordinates: 38°55′48″N 77°06′52″W
- Crosses: Potomac River
- Locale: Washington, D.C. and Arlington County, Virginia

Characteristics
- Design: Girder
- Material: Steel

History
- Construction end: June 17, 1938

Location
- Interactive map of Chain Bridge

The Chain Bridge is a viaduct that crosses the Potomac River at Little Falls in Washington, D.C., and Arlington County, Virginia, United States. The steel girder bridge carries close to 22,000 cars a day. It connects Washington, D.C. with affluent sections of Arlington and Fairfax counties in Virginia. On the Washington, D.C. side, the bridge connects with Canal Road. Left turns onto the Clara Barton Parkway from the Chain Bridge are prohibited, but the reverse is permitted. On the Northern Virginia side, the bridge connects with State Route 123 (Chain Bridge Road), which provides access to George Washington Memorial Parkway.

The Chain Bridge has three lanes (of which the center is reversible) and can be safely accessed by pedestrians and cyclists. The pedestrian sidewalk provides access to the Chesapeake and Ohio Canal towpath via a ramp. The bridge also carries water mains which provide Arlington County, Falls Church, Virginia and a portion of Fairfax County with water from the Washington Aqueduct.

The bridge is the eighth at the site, with the first opening in 1797. The third and fourth versions were chain suspension bridges, and the name was retained for subsequent bridges even though they were of different types. The current bridge's deck was constructed in 1932, atop piers constructed in 1850 for the sixth bridge.

== History ==
=== Early bridges ===
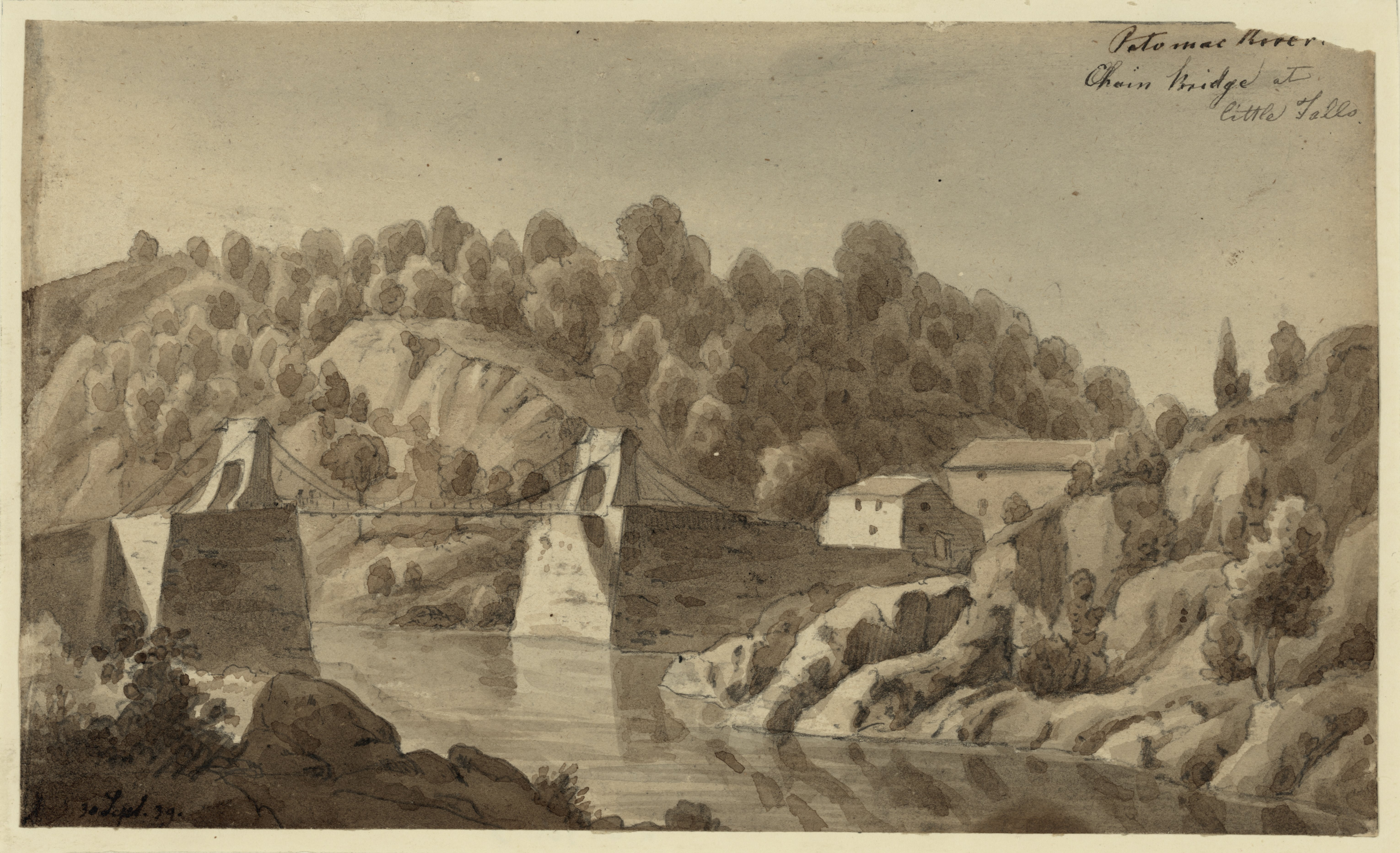
An 1839 illustration of the fourth Chain Bridge

The first bridge at the location opened on July 3, 1797. It was a wooden covered bridge, and rotted and collapsed in 1804.

The second bridge, of similar type, burned six months after it was built.

The third bridge was built four years later in 1808, and its method of construction gave subsequent iterations their names. It was a chain suspension bridge, using 1¼ inch bars. It was designed by Judge James E. Finley, and was 136 feet long by 15 feet wide. It was destroyed by flood in 1810 or 1812.

The fourth bridge was also a chain suspension bridge, and though damaged by floods in 1815, it lasted until 1840.

The fifth bridge was built in 1840, and made of chain and wood. This span collapsed in 1852.

=== Sixth bridge ===
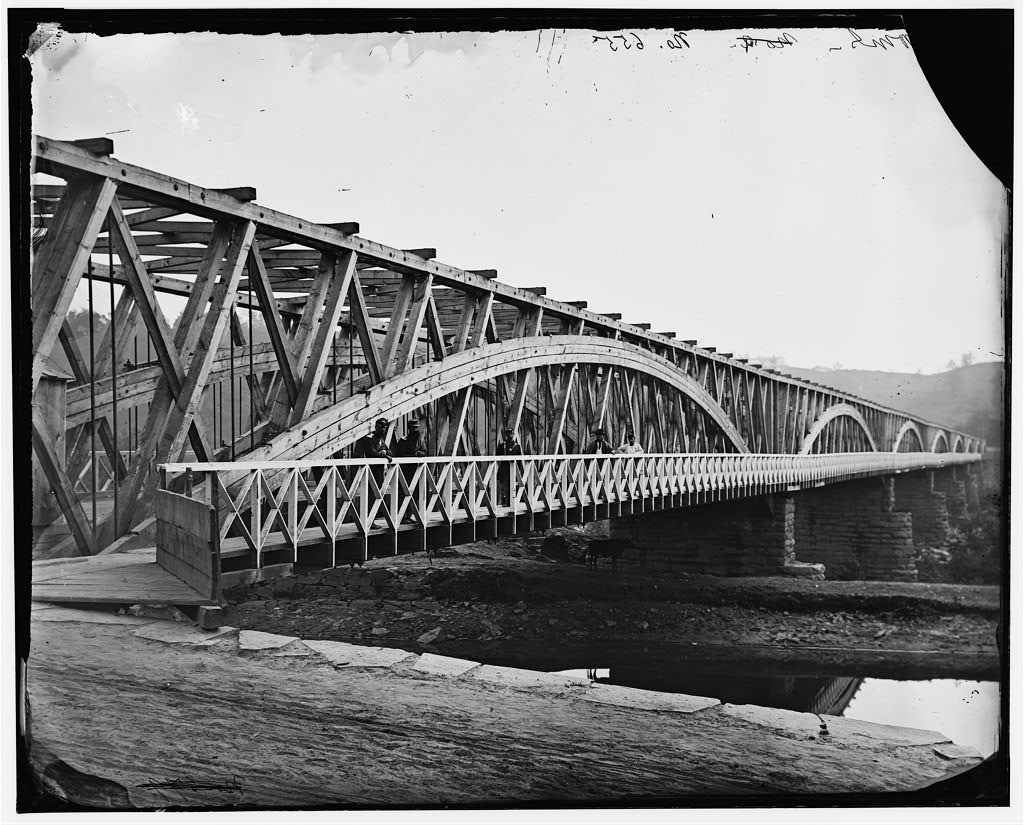
Chain Bridge during American Civil War

It was replaced by a crossbeam truss structure that resembled a long garden arbor or pergola, but retained its historical name. During the American Civil War, the Chain Bridge was a popular place for the Union Army to access the countryside encampments from Fairfax County. The bridge is the site of the first Union Army Balloon Corps balloon crossing, which took place overnight on October 12, 1861, conducted by Professor Thaddeus S. C. Lowe and a band of handlers who had to precariously traverse the outsides of the fully trellised bridge. In a nine-hour ordeal, the balloon Union was fully inflated in Washington and walked out to the battlefield at Lewinsville, Virginia. The truss bridge was swept away in an 1870 flood.

The piers for this bridge, constructed in 1850 were reused for both of the subsequent bridges.

=== Seventh bridge ===
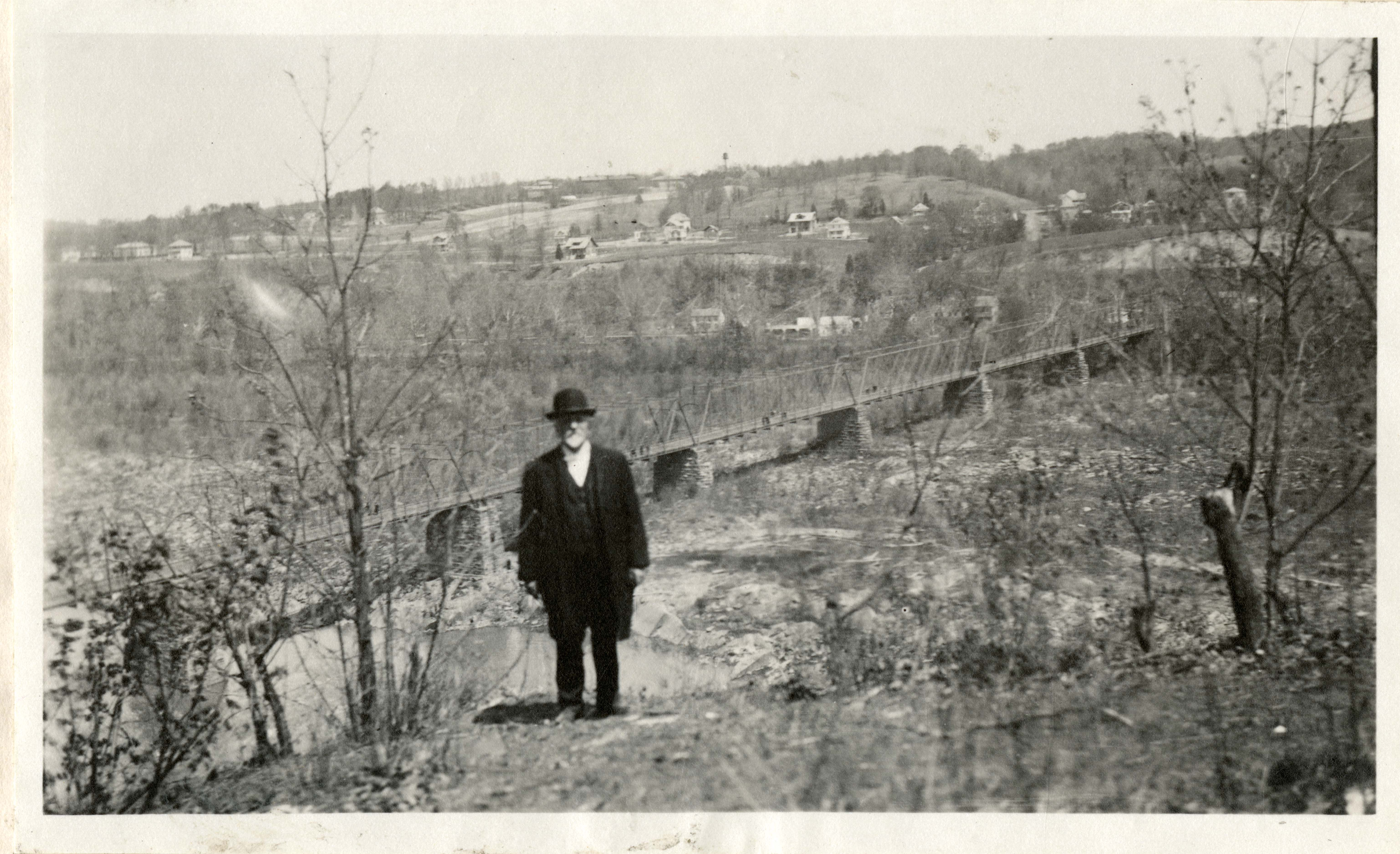
The seventh Chain Bridge in 1920

A lightweight iron truss replacement was erected in 1872–1874. Traffic restrictions were placed on the bridge in 1927, and it was fully closed following the record flood of 1936.

=== Current bridge ===
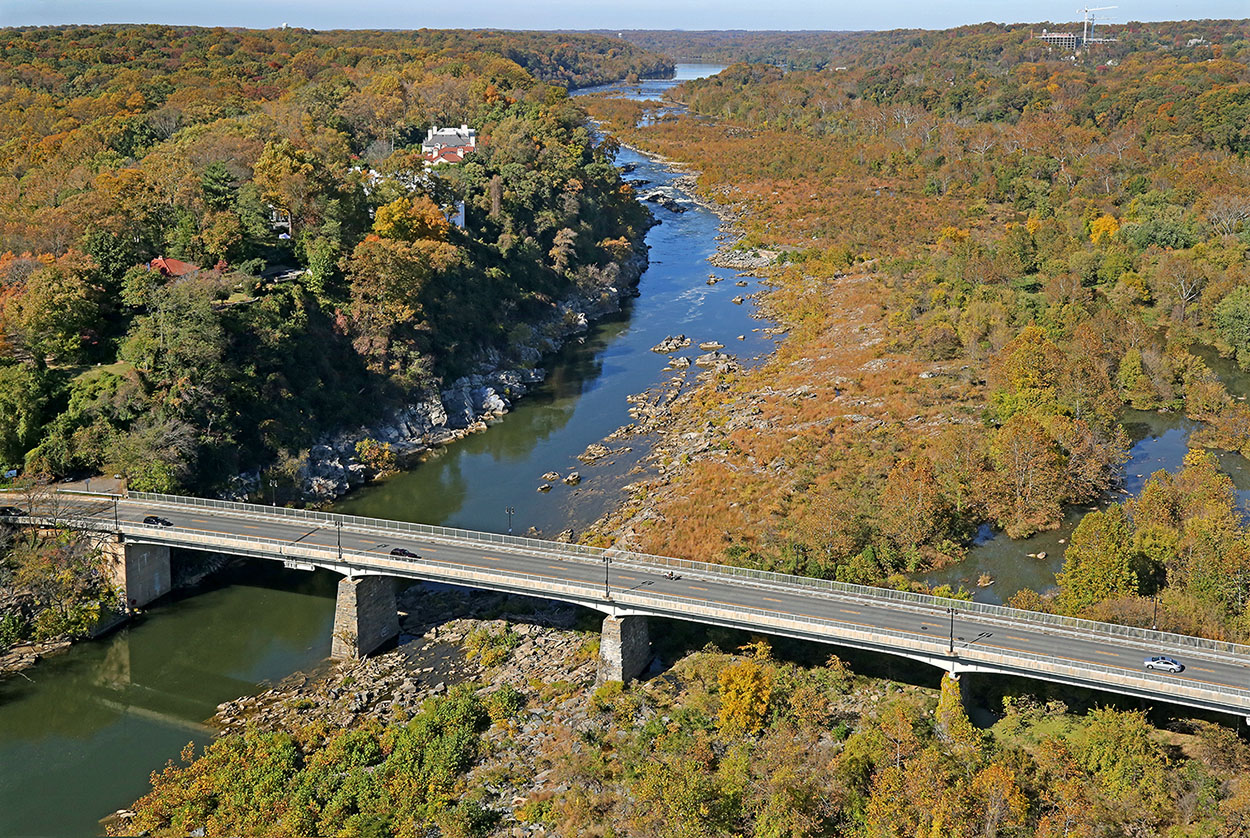
Chain Bridge crossing the Potomac River

The eighth and present version of the bridge is a continuous steel girder structure, completed in 1939 on piers dating from construction in the 1850s or 1870s (there's some ambiguity as to which).

In 1982, the bridge was significantly overhauled. The overhaul widened the three 10-foot wide lanes with a 12 foot wide one and two 11 foot ones. It also replaced a set of stairs from the bridge to the C&O Trail with a ramp, removed the sidewalk on the downstream side, added a crash barrier between the sidewalk and roadway, replaced the old railing with a fence and replaced heavy concrete with a lighter type that allowed the bridge to hold more weight.
