= Dalecarlia Reservoir =

- Location within Maryland
- Location: Bethesda, Maryland / Washington, D.C., U.S.
- Coordinates: 38°56′33.0216″N 77°6′36.1548″W
- Type: Reservoir
- Primary inflows: Washington Aqueduct
- Basin countries: United States
- Surface area: 50 acres (20 ha)
- Surface elevation: 148 ft (45 m)

Dalecarlia Reservoir is the primary storage basin for drinking water in Washington, D.C., and Arlington County, Virginia. The reservoir is fed by an underground aqueduct in turn fed by low dams which divert portions of the Potomac River near Great Falls and Little Falls. The reservoir is located between Spring Valley and the Palisades, two neighborhoods in Northwest Washington, D.C., and Brookmont, a neighborhood in Montgomery County, Maryland.

== History ==
The 50-acre (200,000 m^{2}) reservoir was completed in 1858 by the United States Army Corps of Engineers (USACE) as part of the Washington Aqueduct project. It began providing water on January 3, 1859. Initially the reservoir provided water to the city from the adjacent Little Falls Branch until the aqueduct construction was completed. Regular water service from the Potomac River source through the aqueduct commenced in 1864. The reservoir was modified in 1895 and 1935 to improve water quality and increase water supply.

In the 1920s a water purification plant was built adjacent to the reservoir. The rapid sand filter plant began operation in 1927.

In 1942, the headquarters of the Army Map Service was established on the grounds adjacent to the reservoir; several buildings constructed in the 1940s still exist. In 1946, its headquarters moved to the nearby Sumner Site, which is today the Intelligence Community Campus-Bethesda.

Until the early 21st century, the semi-solid residuals (sludge) produced by the treatment plant were periodically discharged to the Potomac River. The U.S. Environmental Protection Agency (EPA) required USACE to halt most of these discharges, and a residuals handling facility was built on site, which went into operation in 2012.

== Current operation ==
The reservoir and water treatment plant are operated by the Washington Aqueduct, Baltimore District, U.S. Army Corps of Engineers.

== Climate ==
According to the Köppen Climate Classification system, the area has a humid subtropical climate, abbreviated "Cfa" on climate maps. The hottest temperature recorded at Dalecarlia Reservoir was 105 °F (40.6 °C) on August 17, 1997, while the coldest temperature recorded was −11 °F (−23.9 °C) on January 21, 1985.

Climate data for Dalecarlia Reservoir, Maryland, 1991–2020 normals, extremes 1948–present
Month	Jan	Feb	Mar	Apr	May	Jun	Jul	Aug	Sep	Oct	Nov	Dec	Year
Record high °F (°C)	79 (26)	82 (28)	91 (33)	95 (35)	98 (37)	100 (38)	103 (39)	105 (41)	99 (37)	95 (35)	87 (31)	82 (28)	105 (41)
Mean maximum °F (°C)	65.7 (18.7)	68.0 (20.0)	77.9 (25.5)	87.1 (30.6)	91.9 (33.3)	96.0 (35.6)	98.0 (36.7)	96.6 (35.9)	92.1 (33.4)	84.4 (29.1)	75.3 (24.1)	67.2 (19.6)	99.3 (37.4)
Mean daily maximum °F (°C)	42.9 (6.1)	46.4 (8.0)	54.8 (12.7)	67.6 (19.8)	75.7 (24.3)	84.0 (28.9)	88.2 (31.2)	86.2 (30.1)	79.4 (26.3)	68.0 (20.0)	56.4 (13.6)	46.9 (8.3)	66.4 (19.1)
Daily mean °F (°C)	34.2 (1.2)	36.8 (2.7)	44.2 (6.8)	55.6 (13.1)	64.7 (18.2)	73.4 (23.0)	78.1 (25.6)	76.3 (24.6)	69.3 (20.7)	57.4 (14.1)	46.4 (8.0)	38.3 (3.5)	56.2 (13.5)
Mean daily minimum °F (°C)	25.5 (−3.6)	27.3 (−2.6)	33.5 (0.8)	43.6 (6.4)	53.7 (12.1)	62.8 (17.1)	68.0 (20.0)	66.3 (19.1)	59.2 (15.1)	46.8 (8.2)	36.4 (2.4)	29.6 (−1.3)	46.1 (7.8)
Mean minimum °F (°C)	9.2 (−12.7)	13.2 (−10.4)	18.5 (−7.5)	29.0 (−1.7)	39.2 (4.0)	50.1 (10.1)	57.6 (14.2)	55.3 (12.9)	45.6 (7.6)	31.9 (−0.1)	22.4 (−5.3)	16.3 (−8.7)	7.8 (−13.4)
Record low °F (°C)	−11 (−24)	−1 (−18)	5 (−15)	17 (−8)	23 (−5)	30 (−1)	42 (6)	41 (5)	31 (−1)	16 (−9)	8 (−13)	−2 (−19)	−11 (−24)
Average precipitation inches (mm)	3.32 (84)	3.24 (82)	4.15 (105)	3.53 (90)	4.44 (113)	4.24 (108)	5.11 (130)	4.42 (112)	4.54 (115)	4.40 (112)	3.32 (84)	3.81 (97)	48.52 (1,232)
Average snowfall inches (cm)	2.9 (7.4)	1.4 (3.6)	0.7 (1.8)	0.0 (0.0)	0.0 (0.0)	0.0 (0.0)	0.0 (0.0)	0.0 (0.0)	0.0 (0.0)	0.0 (0.0)	0.0 (0.0)	0.8 (2.0)	5.8 (14.8)
Average precipitation days (≥ 0.01 in)	10.0	9.3	11.5	11.1	11.7	10.1	10.3	9.5	9.5	9.4	9.4	11.0	122.8
Average snowy days (≥ 0.1 in)	1.5	1.1	0.5	0.0	0.0	0.0	0.0	0.0	0.0	0.0	0.0	0.7	3.8
Source 1: NOAA
Source 2: National Weather Service

== Gallery ==
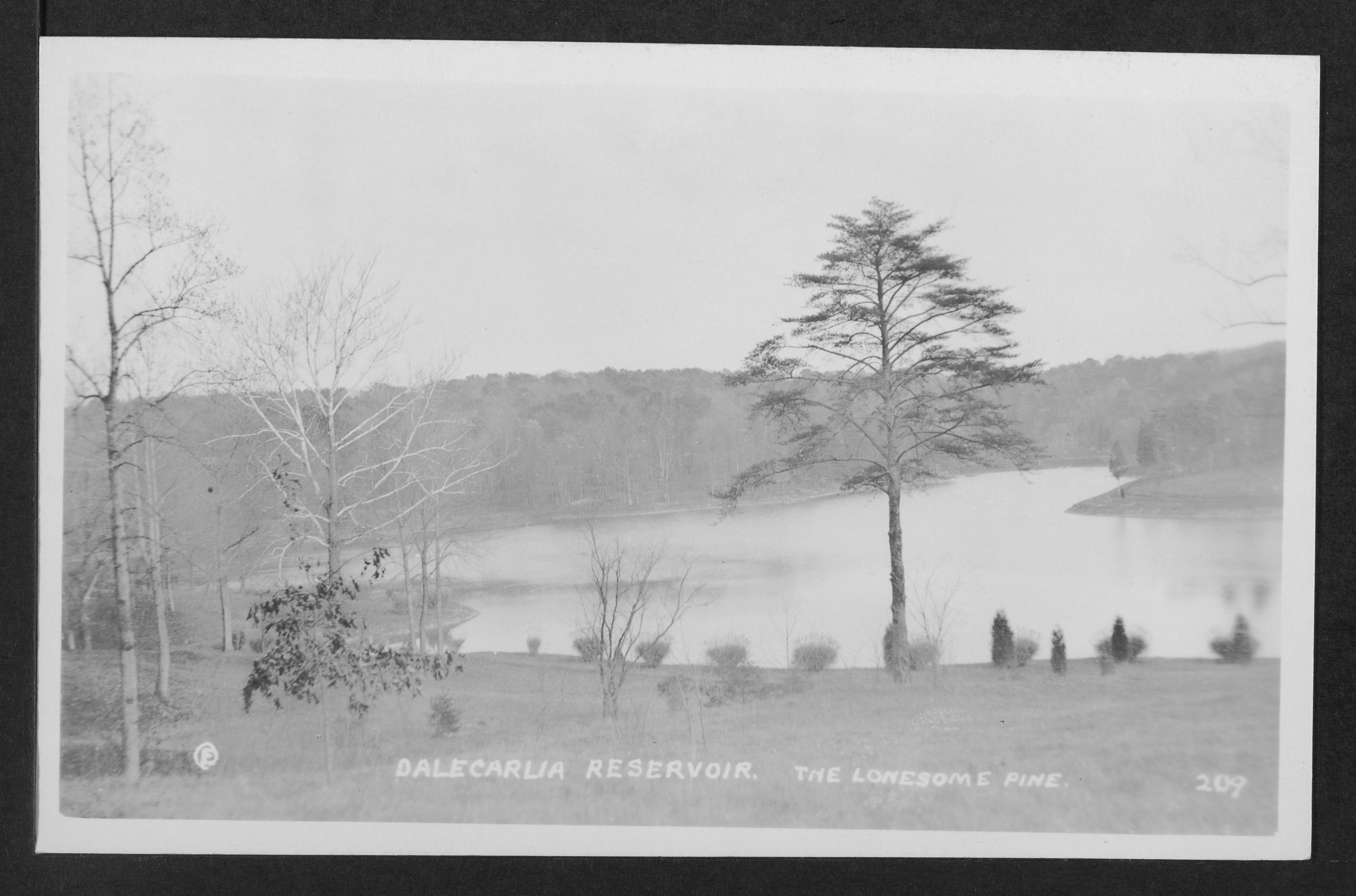
Dalecarlia Reservoir in the early 20th century

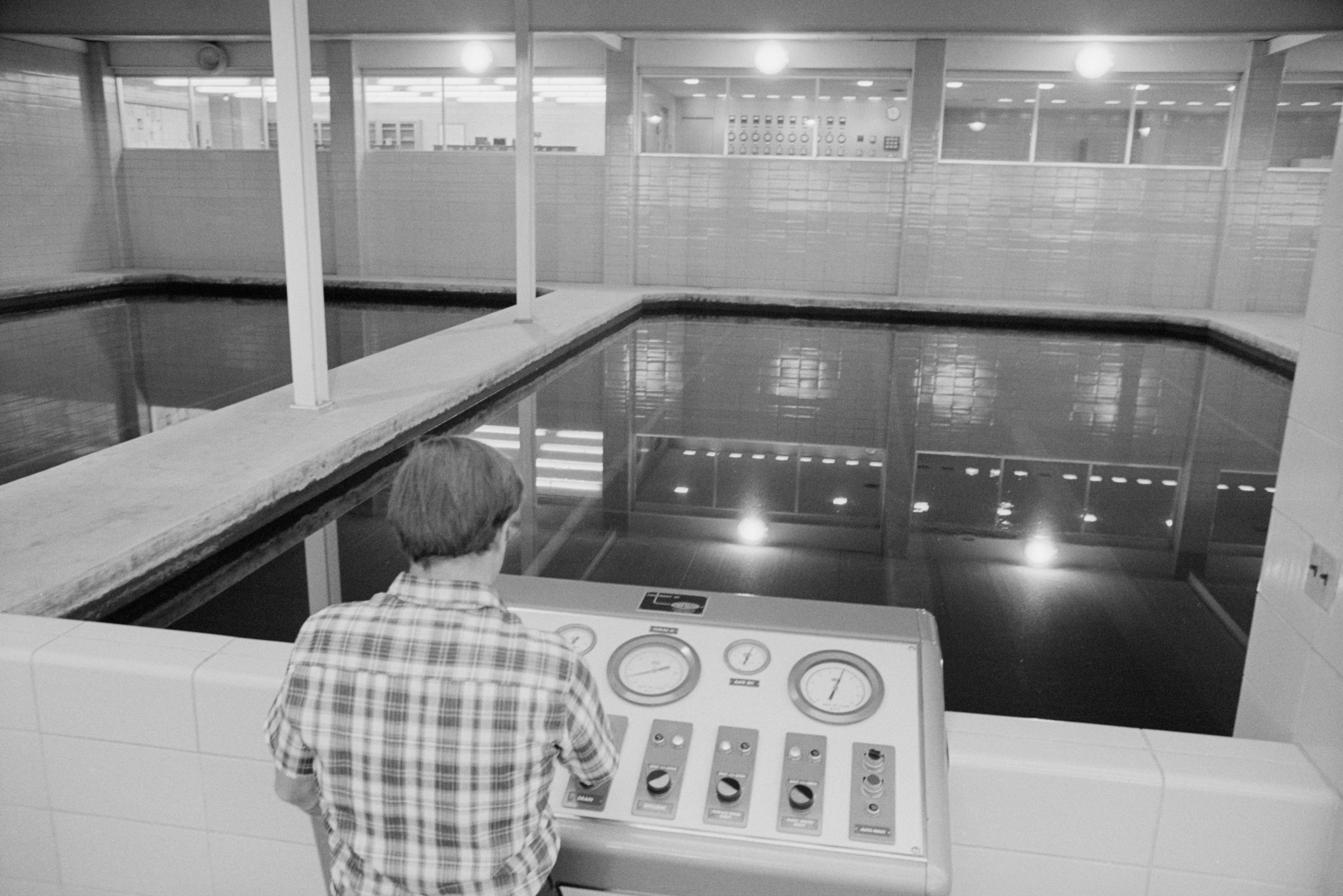
Filtration tanks at the reservoir in 1981

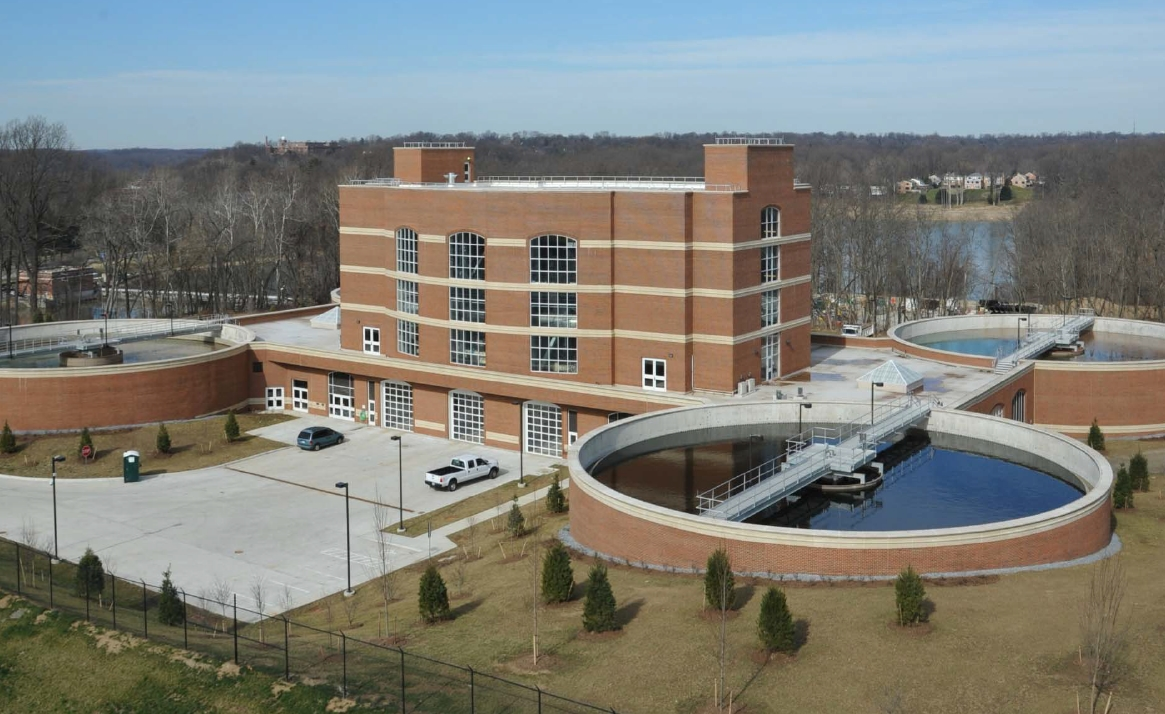
Residuals processing facility at the Dalecarlia Reservoir in 2011

== See also ==
- District of Columbia Water and Sewer Authority
- Georgetown Reservoir
- McMillan Reservoir
