= Little Falls (Potomac River) =

Area of rapids located where the Potomac River crosses the Atlantic Seaboard fall line

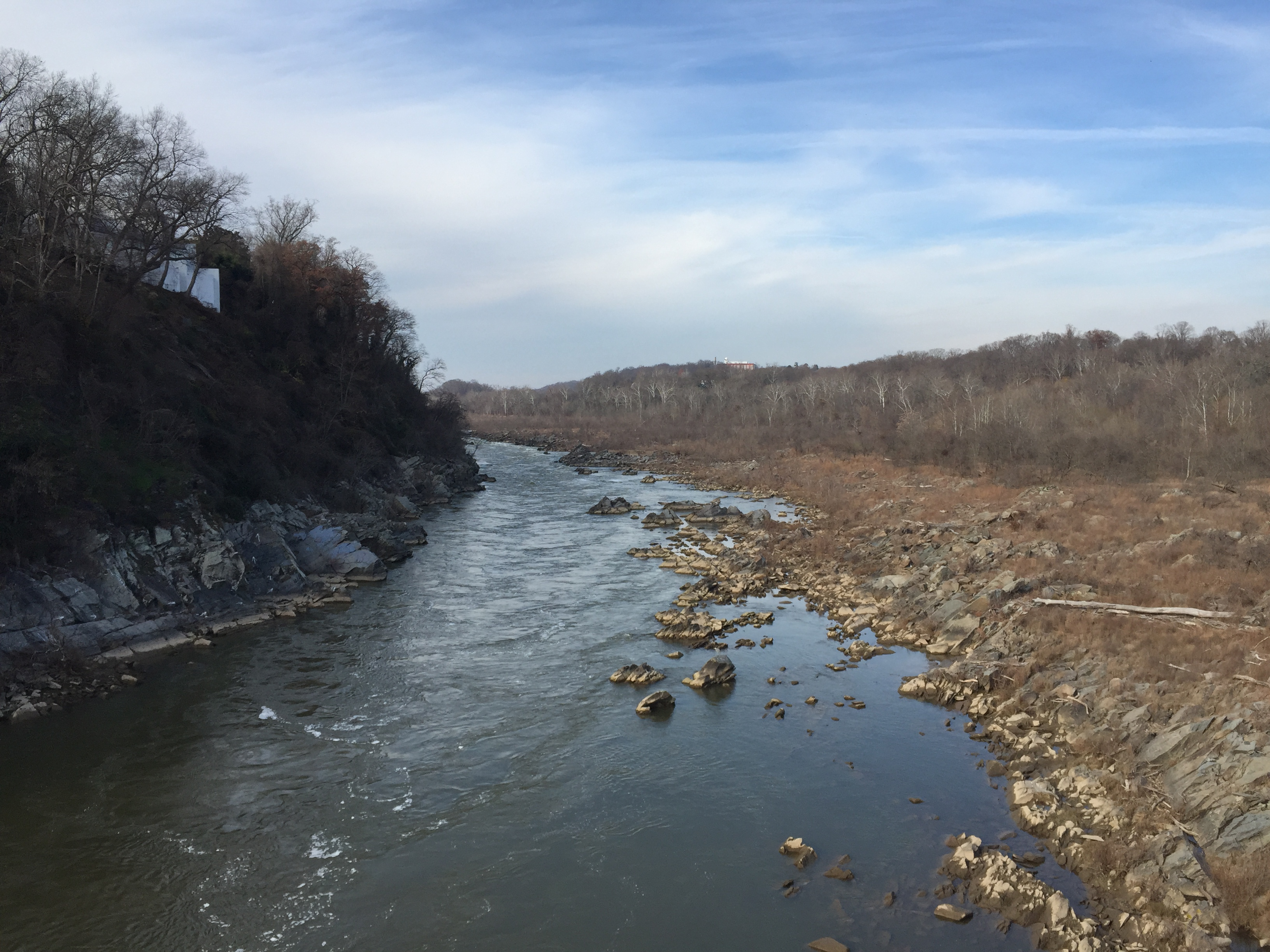
- View of the river near Little Falls from the Chain Bridge
- Interactive map of Little Falls
- Location: Border of Arlington County and Fairfax County, Virginia; Montgomery County, Maryland; and Washington, D.C.
- Coordinates: 38°56′00″N 77°07′05″W
- Type: Cascade
- Elevation: 13 feet (4.0 m)
- Watercourse: Potomac River

Little Falls is an area of rapids located where the Potomac River crosses the Atlantic Seaboard fall line where Washington, DC; Maryland; and Virginia meet. Descending from the harder and older rocks of the Piedmont Plateau to the softer sediments of the Atlantic coastal plain, it is the first upstream "cataract", or barrier, to navigation encountered on the Potomac River. It may be viewed from the heavily trafficked Chain Bridge, about a half mile downstream. It is named in contradistinction to Great Falls, about 10 miles further upstream.

Captain John Smith (1580–1631) of England was the first European to explore the Potomac as far as Little Falls. When he arrived there in 1608 he noted that "as for deer, buffaloes, bears and turkeys, the woods do swarm with them and the soil is extremely fertile." By 1757, the name of a nearby Anglican Church building — "The Falls Church" — referenced this location near the main tobacco rolling road circumventing Little Falls. The local settlement of Falls Church, Virginia, which grew up there, soon followed suit.

== Namesakes ==
- Little Falls Dam (Potomac River)
- Little Falls Reservoir, Montgomery County, Maryland
- Little Falls Branch, Montgomery County, Maryland
- Little Falls Stream Valley Park, Montgomery County, Maryland
- Little Falls Parkway, Montgomery County, Maryland
- The Falls Church, Falls Church, Virginia (est. 1732)
