= Georgetown Reservoir =

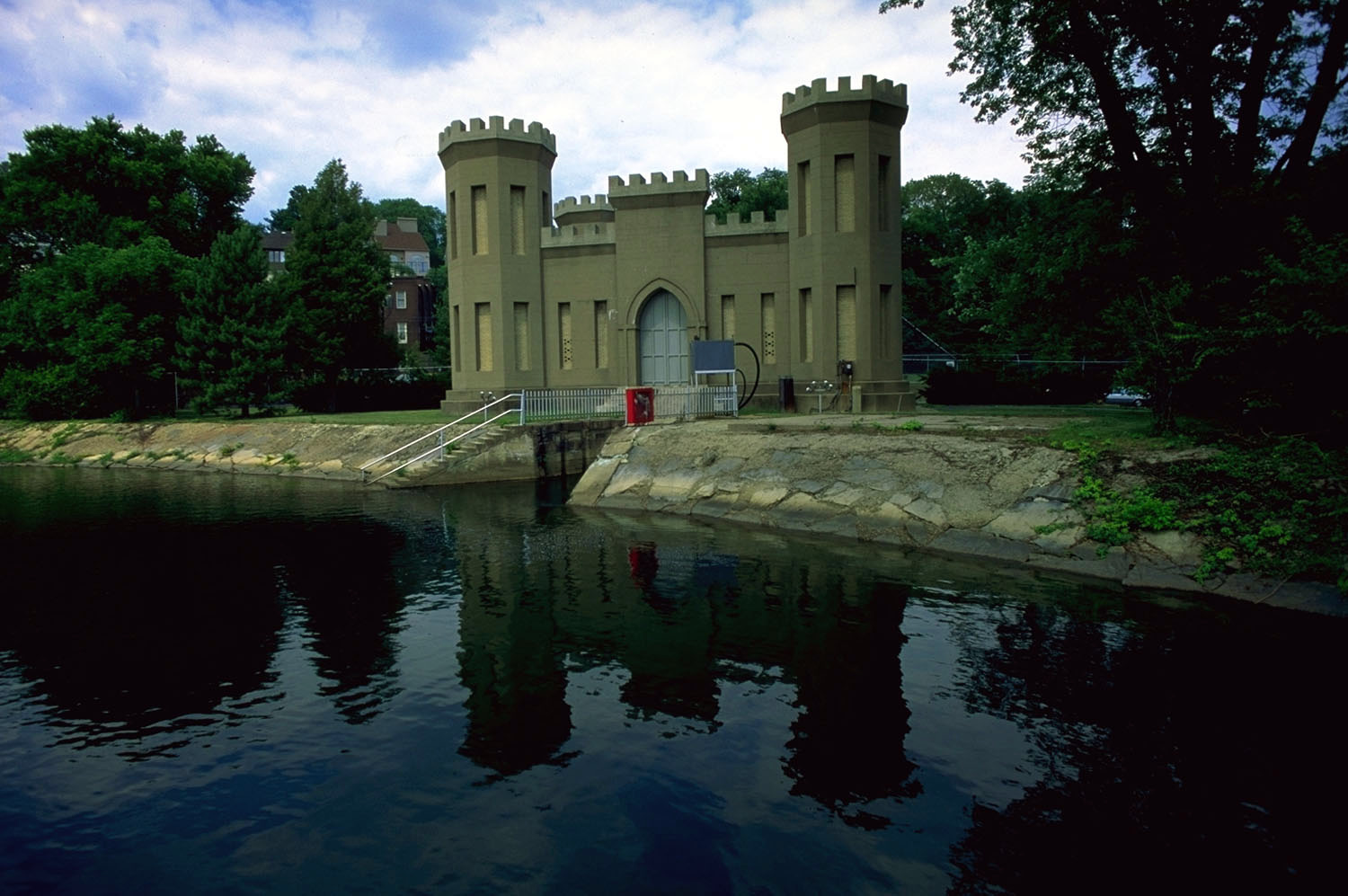
- The Castle Gatehouse, modeled after the U.S. Army Corps of Engineers insignia

- Location within the District of Columbia
- Location: District of Columbia
- Coordinates: 38°54′44.43″N 77°5′33.94″W
- Type: Reservoir
- Basin countries: United States
- Water volume: 140,000,000 US gallons (530,000 m^{3})

The Georgetown Reservoir is a reservoir that provides water to the District of Columbia. Part of the city’s water supply and treatment infrastructure, it is located in the Palisades neighborhood, about two miles downstream from the Maryland–D.C. boundary.

The reservoir was built by the United States Army Corps of Engineers as part of the Washington Aqueduct project. It was partially completed by 1858, but work was suspended for lack of funds. Construction began again in 1862, and was complete in 1864. Additional construction and modifications to the reservoir were carried out in the 1860s and 1870s.

Water from the Dalecarlia Reservoir is pumped to the Georgetown Reservoir for further sedimentation before being treated at the McMillan Reservoir. The reservoirs and the nearby Dalecarlia water treatment plant are operated by the Army Corps of Engineers. The treated water is distributed throughout the city in water mains managed by the D.C. Water and Sewer Authority.

At the outlet of the Georgetown facility is a sluice gate building that controls the flow of water into Washington City Tunnel, which leads to the McMillan Reservoir. This structure, called the Georgetown Castle Gatehouse, was built by the Army (c. 1901) in the shape of a castle.

Due to its distinctive shape and location, the reservoir basin serves as a landmark for the River Visual approach to nearby Ronald Reagan National Airport.
