= Great Falls Dam =

Great Falls Dam can refer to:

- Great Falls Dearborn Dam, a hydroelectric dam on the Catawba River, South Carolina
- Great Falls Dam (Maryland-Virginia), a proposed dam on the Potomac River, later proposed as Seneca Dam
- Great Falls Dam (Tennessee), a hydroelectric dam on the Caney Fork near Rock Island, Tennessee, USA
- Great Falls Dam (Manitoba), a hydroelectric dam on the Winnipeg River near Selkirk, Manitoba, Canada
