= Potomac River =

River in the Mid-Atlantic United States

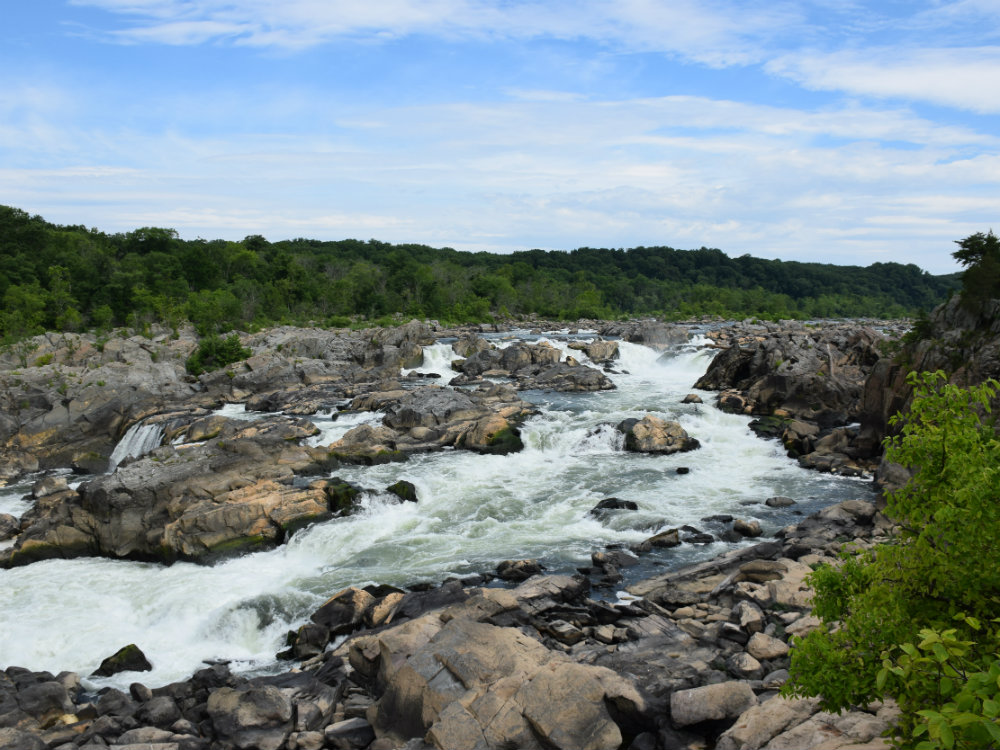
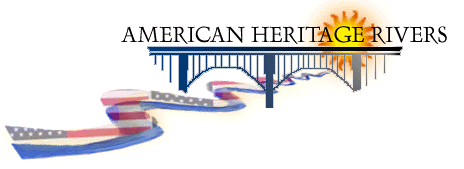
- Great Falls of the Potomac River in June 2017

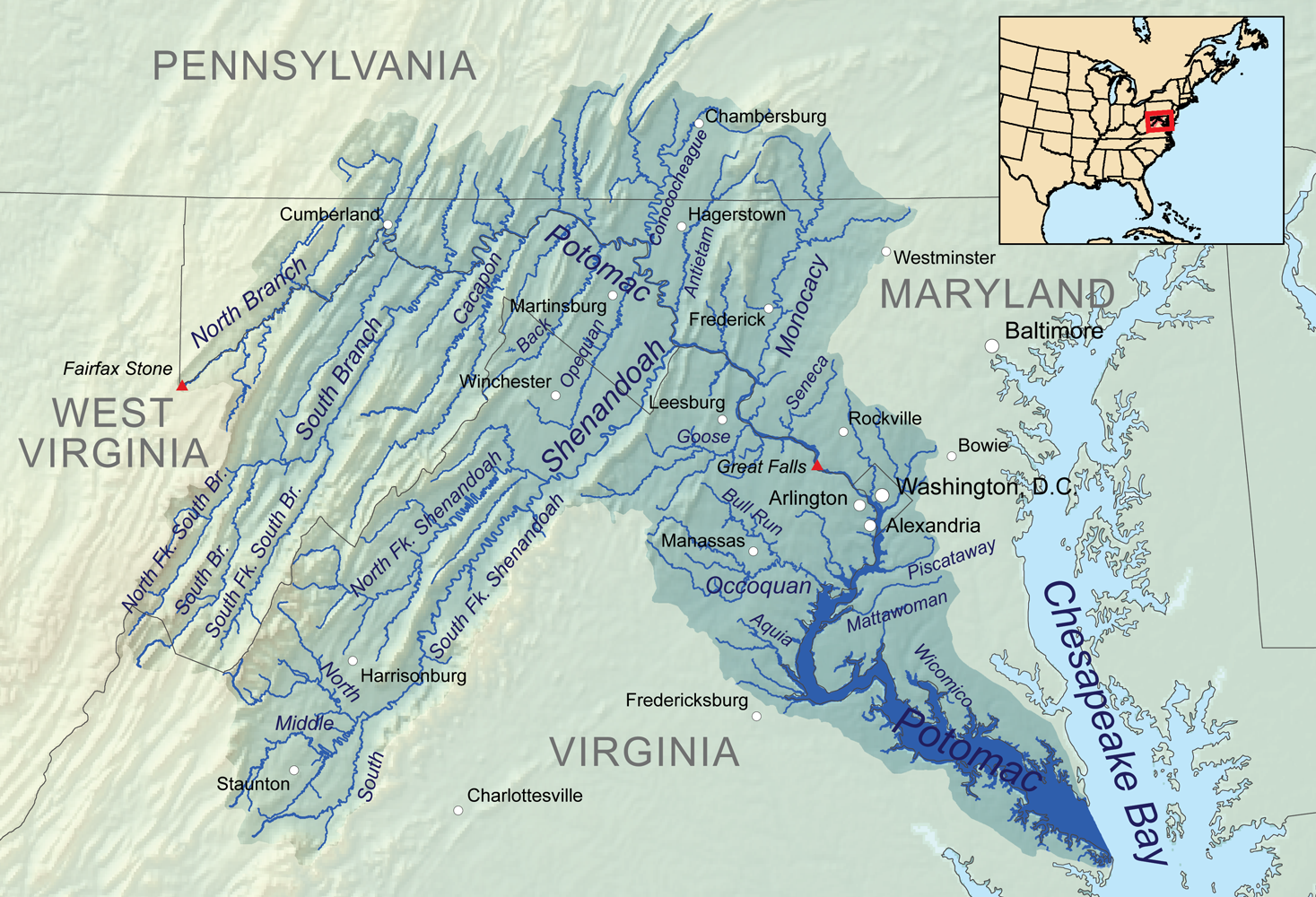
- The Potomac River watershed covers the District of Columbia and parts of four states.
- Native name: Patawomeck (Algonquian languages)

Location
- Country: United States
- State: West Virginia, Maryland, Virginia, District of Columbia
- Cities: Cumberland, MD; Harpers Ferry, WV; Washington, DC; Alexandria, VA

Physical characteristics
- Source: North Branch
  - location: Fairfax Stone, Preston County, West Virginia
  - coordinates: 39°11′43″N 79°29′28″W
  - elevation: 3,060 ft (930 m)
- 2nd source: South Branch
  - location: Near Monterey, Highland County, Virginia
  - coordinates: 38°25′30″N 79°36′27″W
- Source confluence
  - location: Green Spring, West Virginia
  - coordinates: 39°31′39″N 78°35′15″W
- Mouth: Chesapeake Bay
  - location: St. Mary's County, Maryland/Northumberland County, Virginia, United States
  - coordinates: 38°00′00″N 76°20′06″W
  - elevation: 0 ft (0 m)
- Length: 405 mi (652 km)
- Basin size: 14,700 sq mi (38,000 km^{2})
- Discharge
  - location: Little Falls, near Washington, D.C. (non-tidal; water years: 1931–2018)
  - average: 11,498 cu ft/s (325.6 m^{3}/s) (1931–2018)
  - minimum: 4,017 cu ft/s (113.7 m^{3}/s) (2002)
  - maximum: 484,000 cu ft/s (13,700 m^{3}/s) (1936)
- Discharge
  - location: Point of Rocks, Maryland
  - average: 9,504 cu ft/s (269.1 m^{3}/s)
- Discharge
  - location: Hancock, Maryland
  - average: 4,168 cu ft/s (118.0 m^{3}/s)
- Discharge
  - location: Paw Paw, West Virginia
  - average: 3,376 cu ft/s (95.6 m^{3}/s)

Basin features
- Tributaries
  - left: Conococheague Creek, Antietam Creek, Monocacy River, Rock Creek, Anacostia River, Wicomico River
  - right: Cacapon River, Shenandoah River, Goose Creek, Occoquan River
- Waterfalls: Great Falls, Little Falls
- Note: Since 1996, the Potomac has been the 'sister river' of the Ara River of Tokyo

The Potomac River (/pəˈtoʊmək/) is in the Mid-Atlantic region of the United States and flows from the Potomac Highlands in West Virginia to the Chesapeake Bay in Maryland. It is 405 miles (652 km) long, with a drainage area of 14,700 square miles (38,000 km^{2}), and is the fourth-largest river along the East Coast of the United States. More than 6 million people live within its watershed.

The river forms the boundary separating the jurisdictions on its left descending bank (Maryland and Washington, D.C.) from those on its right descending bank (West Virginia and Virginia). Except for a small portion of its headwaters in West Virginia, the North Branch Potomac River is considered part of Maryland to the low-water mark on the opposite bank. The South Branch Potomac River lies completely within the state of West Virginia except for its headwaters, which lie in Virginia. All navigable parts of the river were designated as a National Recreation Trail in 2006, and the National Oceanic and Atmospheric Administration (NOAA) designated an 18-square-mile (47 km^{2}) portion of the river in Charles County, Maryland, as the Mallows Bay–Potomac River National Marine Sanctuary in 2019.

The river has significant historical and political significance, as the nation's capital of Washington, D.C. is located on its banks, as is Mount Vernon, the home of George Washington. During the American Civil War, the river became the boundary between the Union and the Confederacy, and the Union's largest army, the Army of the Potomac, was named after the river.

== Course ==
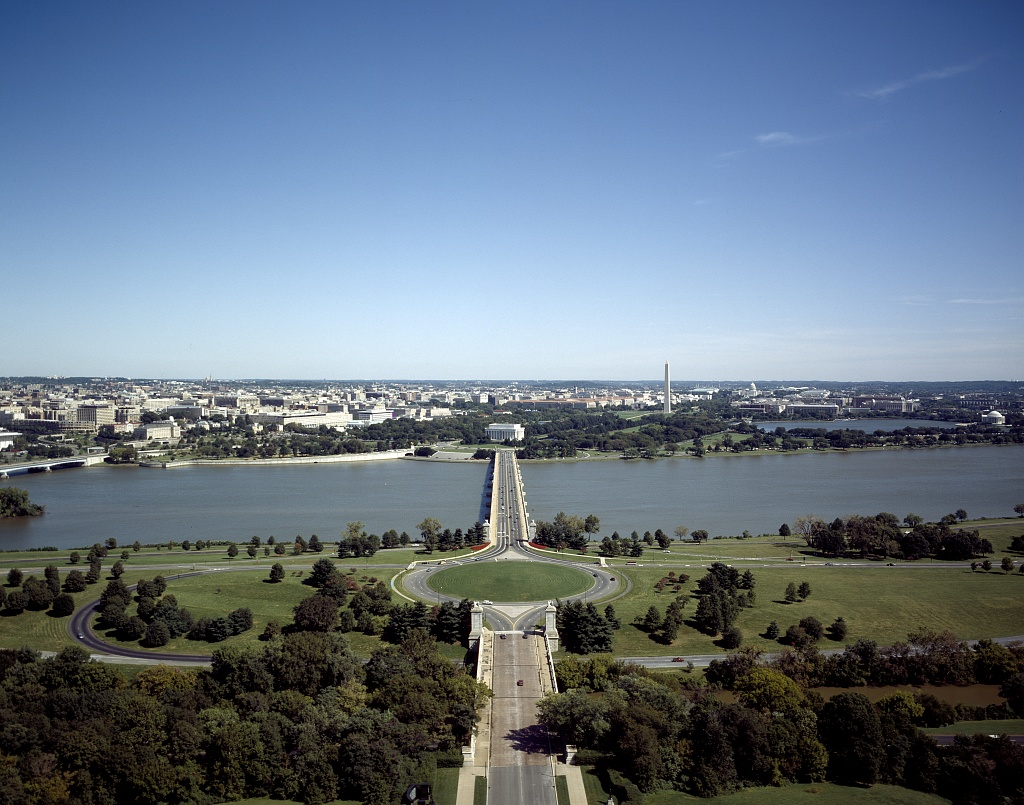
In Washington, D.C., the Potomac is crossed by the Arlington Memorial Bridge.

The Potomac River runs 405 mi (652 km) from Fairfax Stone Historical Monument State Park in West Virginia on the Allegheny Plateau to Point Lookout, Maryland, and drains 14,679 sq mi (38,020 km^{2}). The length of the river from the junction of its North and South Branches to Point Lookout is 302 mi (486 km).

The river has two sources. The source of the North Branch is at the Fairfax Stone located at the junction of Grant, Tucker, and Preston counties in West Virginia. The source of the South Branch is located near Hightown in northern Highland County, Virginia. The river's two branches converge just east of Green Spring in Hampshire County, West Virginia, to form the Potomac. As it flows from its headwaters down to the Chesapeake Bay, the Potomac traverses five geological provinces: the Appalachian Plateau, the Ridge and Valley, the Blue Ridge, the Piedmont Plateau, and the Atlantic coastal plain.

Once the Potomac drops from the Piedmont to the Coastal Plain at the Atlantic Seaboard fall line at Little Falls, tides further influence the river as it passes through Washington, D.C., and beyond. Salinity in the Potomac River Estuary increases thereafter with distance downstream. The estuary also widens, reaching 11 statute miles (17 km) wide at its mouth, between Point Lookout, Maryland, and Smith Point, Virginia, before flowing into the Chesapeake Bay.

=== North Branch Potomac River ===
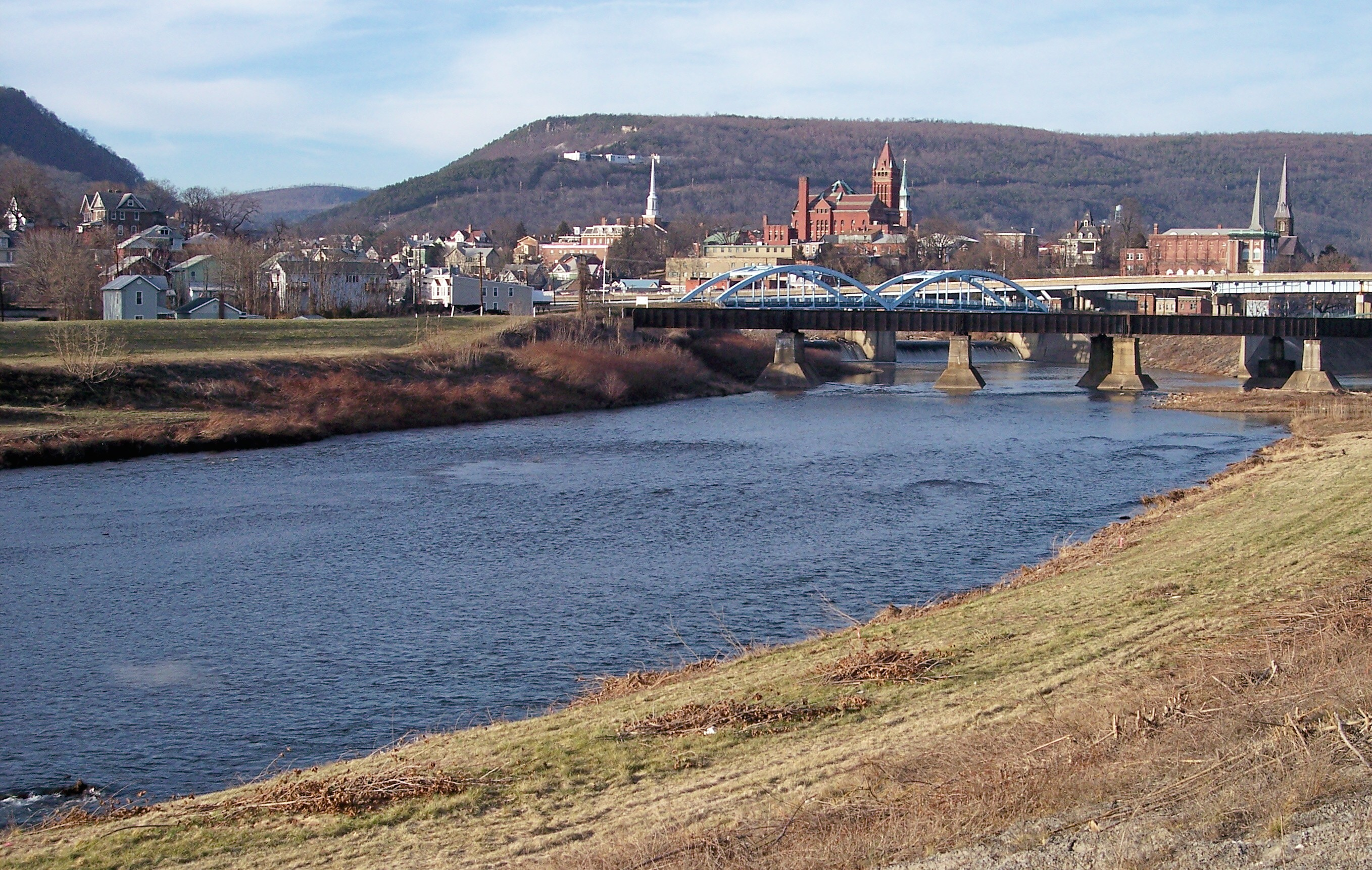
The North Branch between Cumberland, Maryland, and Ridgeley, West Virginia, in 2007

The source of the North Branch Potomac River is at the Fairfax Stone located at the junction of Grant, Tucker and Preston counties in West Virginia. From the Fairfax Stone, the North Branch Potomac River flows 27 mi (43 km) to the man-made Jennings Randolph Lake, an impoundment designed for flood control and emergency water supply. Below the dam, the North Branch cuts a serpentine path through the eastern Allegheny Mountains.

It flows northeast by the communities of Bloomington, Luke, and Westernport in Maryland and then on by Keyser, West Virginia to Cumberland, Maryland. At Cumberland, the river turns southeast. 103 miles (166 km) downstream from its source, the North Branch is joined by the South Branch between Green Spring and South Branch Depot, West Virginia from whence it flows past Hancock, Maryland and turns southeast once more on its way toward Washington, D.C., and the Chesapeake Bay.

=== South Branch Potomac River ===
The South Branch's source is northwest of Hightown along U.S. Route 250 on the eastern side of Lantz Mountain (3,934 ft) in Highland County, Virginia. From Hightown, the South Branch is a small meandering stream that flows northeast along Blue Grass Valley Road through the communities of New Hampden and Blue Grass. At Forks of Waters, the South Branch joins with Strait Creek and flows north across the Virginia/West Virginia border into Pendleton County.

The river then travels on a northeastern course along the western side of Jack Mountain (4,045 ft), followed by Sandy Ridge (2,297 ft) along U.S. Route 220. North of the confluence of the South Branch with Smith Creek, the river flows along Town Mountain (2,848 ft) around Franklin at the junction of U.S. Route 220 and U.S. Route 33. After Franklin, the South Branch continues north through the Monongahela National Forest to Upper Tract where it joins with three sizeable streams: Reeds Creek, Mill Run, and Deer Run.

Between Big Mountain (2,582 ft) and Cave Mountain (2,821 ft), the South Branch bends around the Eagle Rock (1,483 ft) outcrop and continues its flow northward into Grant County. Into Grant, the South Branch follows the western side of Cave Mountain through the 20-mile (32 km) long Smoke Hole Canyon, until its confluence with the North Fork at Cabins, where it flows east to Petersburg. At Petersburg, the South Branch Valley Railroad begins, which parallels the river until its mouth at Green Spring.

In its eastern course from Petersburg into Hardy County, the South Branch becomes more navigable allowing for canoes and smaller river vessels. The river splits and forms a series of large islands while it heads northeast to Moorefield. At Moorefield, the South Branch is joined by the South Fork South Branch Potomac River and runs north to Old Fields where it is fed by Anderson Run and Stony Run.

At McNeill, the South Branch flows into the Trough where it is bound to its west by Mill Creek Mountain (2,119 ft) and to its east by Sawmill Ridge (1,644 ft). This area is the habitat to bald eagles. The Trough passes into Hampshire County and ends at its confluence with Sawmill Run south of Glebe and Sector.

The South Branch continues north parallel to South Branch River Road (County Route 8) toward Romney with a number of historic plantation farms adjoining it. En route to Romney, the river is fed by Buffalo Run, Mill Run, McDowell Run, and Mill Creek at Vanderlip. The South Branch is traversed by the Northwestern Turnpike (U.S. Route 50) and joined by Sulphur Spring Run where it forms Valley View Island to the west of town.

Flowing north of Romney, the river still follows the eastern side of Mill Creek Mountain until it creates a horseshoe bend at Wappocomo's Hanging Rocks around the George W. Washington plantation, Ridgedale. To the west of Three Churches on the western side of South Branch Mountain, 3,028 feet (923 m), the South Branch creates a series of bends and flows to the northeast by Springfield through Blue's Ford. After two additional horseshoe bends (meanders), the South Branch flows under the old Baltimore and Ohio Railroad mainline between Green Spring and South Branch Depot, and joins the North Branch to form the Potomac.

=== Upper Potomac River ===
This stretch encompasses the section of the Potomac River from the confluence of its North and South Branches through Opequon Creek near Shepherdstown, West Virginia. Along the way the following tributaries drain into the Potomac: North Branch Potomac River, South Branch Potomac River, Town Creek, Little Cacapon River, Sideling Hill Creek, Cacapon River, Sir Johns Run, Warm Spring Run, Tonoloway Creek, Fifteenmile Creek, Sleepy Creek, Cherry Run, Back Creek, Conococheague Creek, and Opequon Creek.

=== Lower Potomac River ===
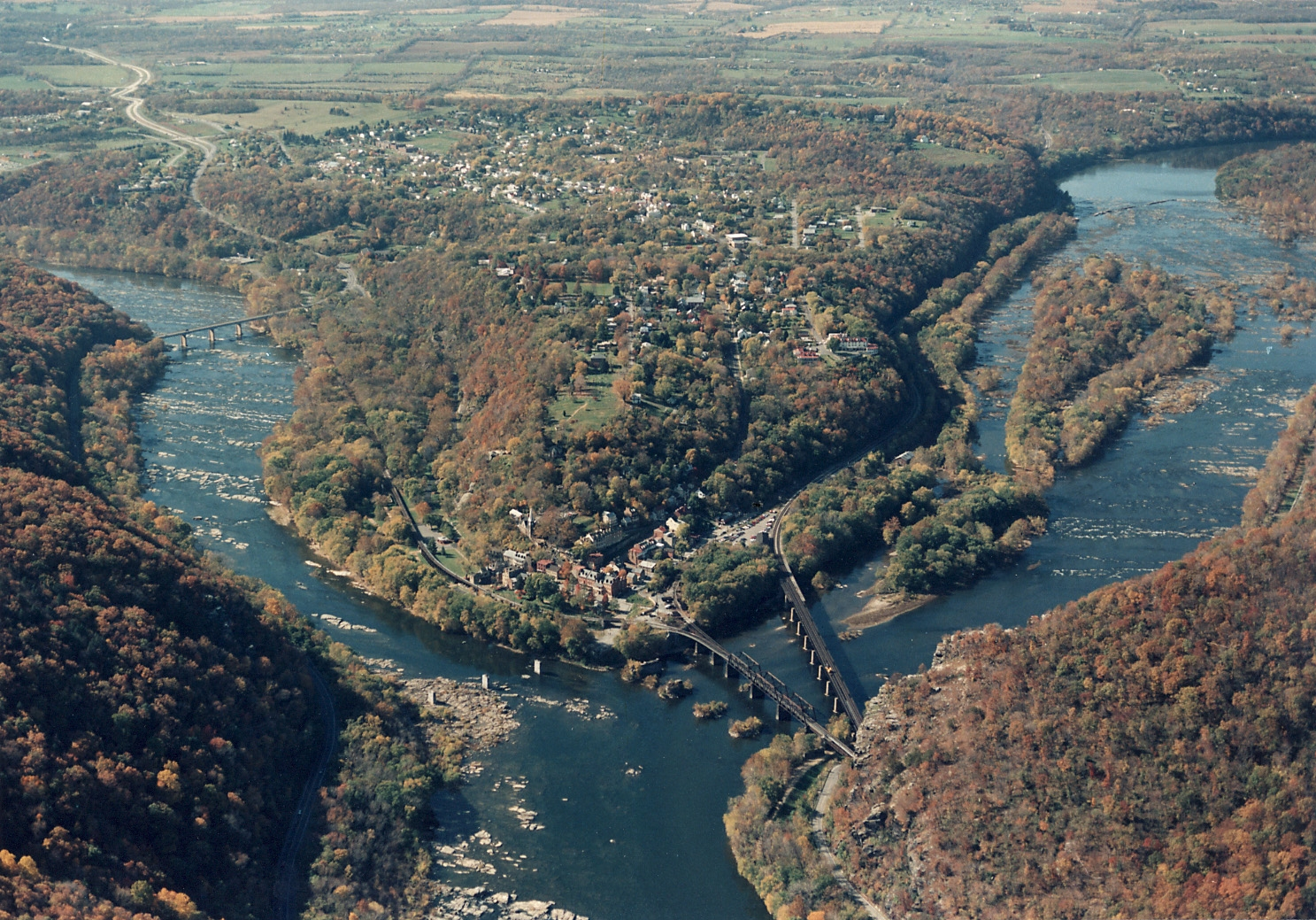
Confluence of the Potomac and Shenandoah at Harpers Ferry

This section covers the Potomac from just above Harpers Ferry in West Virginia down to Little Falls, Maryland on the border between Maryland and Washington, DC. Along the way the following tributaries drain into the Potomac: Antietam Creek, Shenandoah River, Catoctin Creek (Virginia), Catoctin Creek (Maryland), Tuscarora Creek, Monocacy River, Little Monocacy River, Broad Run, Goose Creek, Broad Run, Horsepen Branch, Little Seneca Creek, Tenmile Creek, Great Seneca Creek, Old Sugarland Run, Muddy Branch, Nichols Run, Watts Branch, Limekiln Branch, Carroll Branch, Pond Run, Clarks Branch, Mine Run Branch, Difficult Run, Bullneck Run, Rock Run, Scott Run, Dead Run, Turkey Run, Cabin John Creek, Minnehaha Branch, and Little Falls Branch.

=== Tidal Potomac River ===
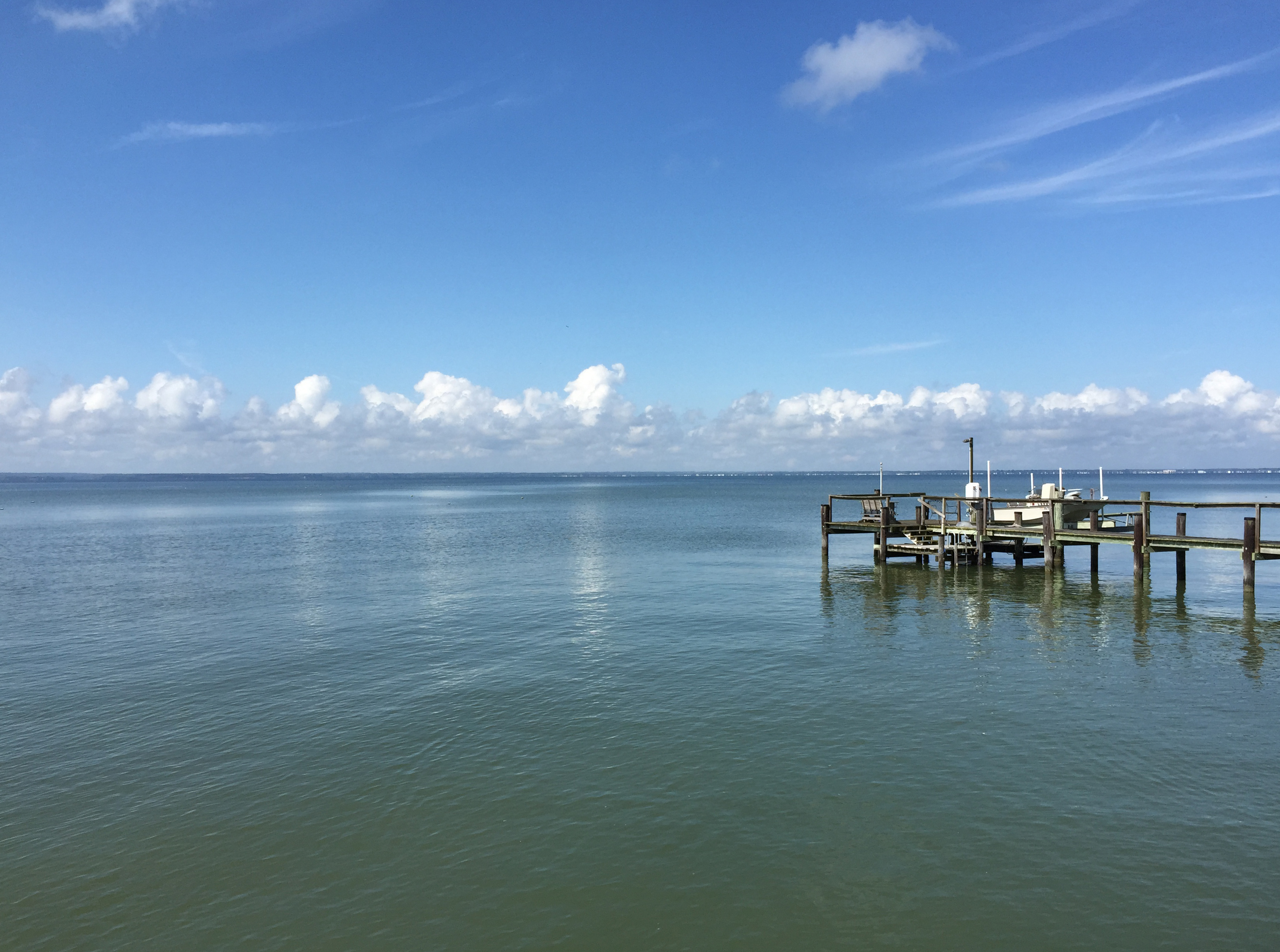
Southwest across the tidal Potomac River from the south end of Cobb Island Road on Cobb Island, Charles County, Maryland

The Tidal Potomac River lies below the Fall Line. This 108-mile (174-km) stretch encompasses the Potomac from a short distance below the Washington, DC - Montgomery County line, just downstream of the Little Falls of the Potomac River, to the Chesapeake Bay.

Along the way the following tributaries drain into the Potomac: Pimmit Run, Gulf Branch, Donaldson Run, Windy Run, Spout Run, Maddox Branch, Foundry Branch, Rock Creek, Rocky Run, Tiber Creek, Roaches Run, Washington Channel, Anacostia River, Four Mile Run, Oxon Creek, Hunting Creek, Broad Creek, Henson Creek, Swan Creek, Piscataway Creek, Little Hunting Creek, Dogue Creek, Accotink Creek, Pohick Creek, Pomonkey Creek, Occoquan River, and Neabsco Creek.

Further tributaries include Powell's Creek, Mattawoman Creek, Chicamuxen Creek, Quantico Creek, Little Creek, Chopawamsic Creek, Tank Creek, Aquia Creek, Potomac Creek, Nanjemoy Creek, Chotank Creek, Port Tobacco River, Popes Creek, Gambo Creek, Clifton Creek, Piccowaxen Creek, Upper Machodoc Creek, Wicomico River, Cobb Island, Monroe Creek, Mattox Creek, Popes Creek, Breton Bay, Leonardtown, St. Marys River, Yeocomico River, Coan River, and Hull Creek.

== History ==
=== Natural history ===
The river itself is at least 3.5 million years old, likely extending back ten to twenty million years before the present when the Atlantic Ocean lowered and exposed coastal sediments along the fall line. This included the area at Great Falls, which eroded into its present form during recent glaciation periods.

The stream gradient of the entire river is 0.14%, a drop of 930 m over 652 km.

=== Human history ===
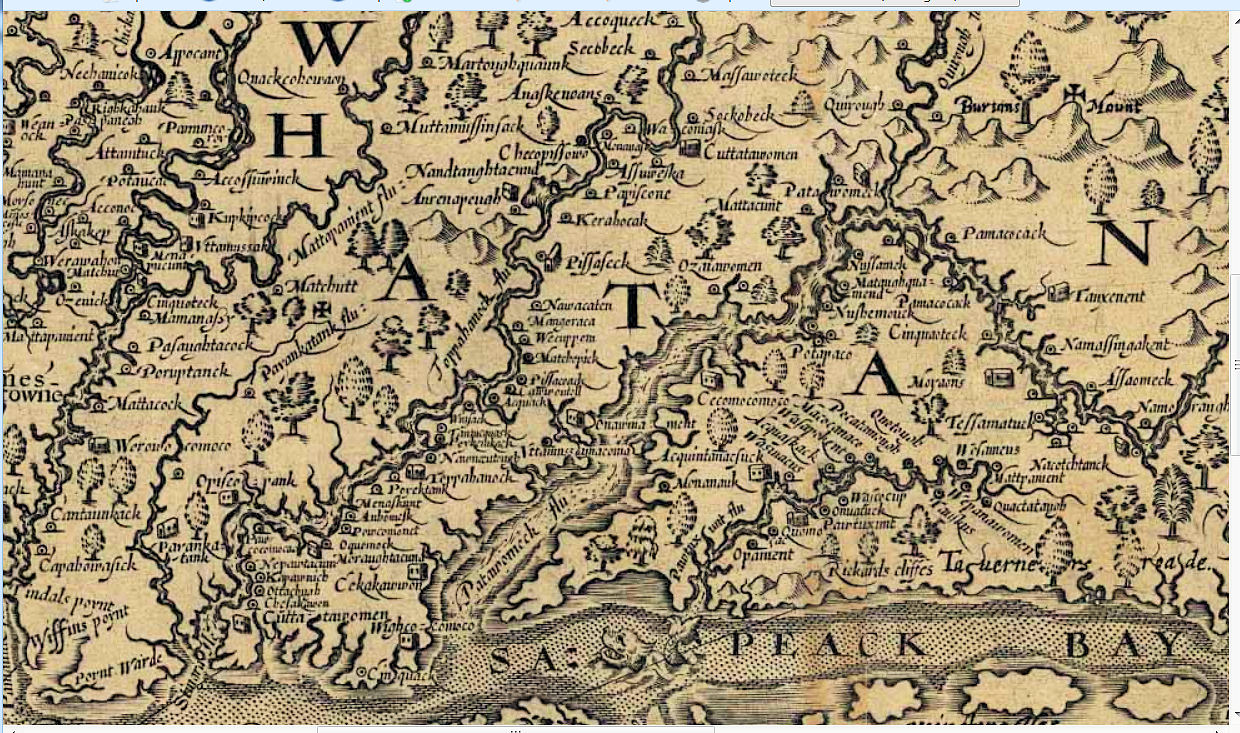
Captain John Smith's 1608 map

The Potomac River has long been inhabited by Native Americans, including being the periphery of the Delaware Adena culture. Precontact, the region was governed by the Algonquian Piscataway confederacy and their allies as warfare in the region increased. This led to the formation of a more complex political system led by the Tayac with countless Werowances governing local affairs. Their confederacy fractured precontact into smaller werowancies and alliances as power shifted south to the Powhatan confederacy.

"Potomac" is a European spelling of Patawomeck, the Algonquian name of a Native American village on its southern bank. Native Americans had different names for different parts of the river, calling the river above Great Falls Cohongarooton, meaning "honking geese" and "Patawomke" below the Falls, meaning "river of swans".

In 1608, Captain John Smith explored the river now known as the Potomac and made drawings of his observations which were later compiled into a map and published in London in 1612. This detail from that map shows his rendition of the river that the local tribes had told him was called the "Patawomeck". The spelling of the name has taken many forms over the years from "Patawomeck" (as on Captain John Smith's map) to "Patomake", "Patowmack", and numerous other variations in the 18th century and now "Potomac". The river's name was officially decided upon as "Potomac" by the Board on Geographic Names in 1931.

The similarity of the name to the Ancient Greek word for river, potamos, has been noted for more than two centuries but it appears to be due to chance.

The Potomac River brings together a variety of cultures throughout the watershed from the coal miners of upstream West Virginia to the urban residents of the nation's capital and, along the lower Potomac, the watermen of Virginia's Northern Neck.

Civil War Era

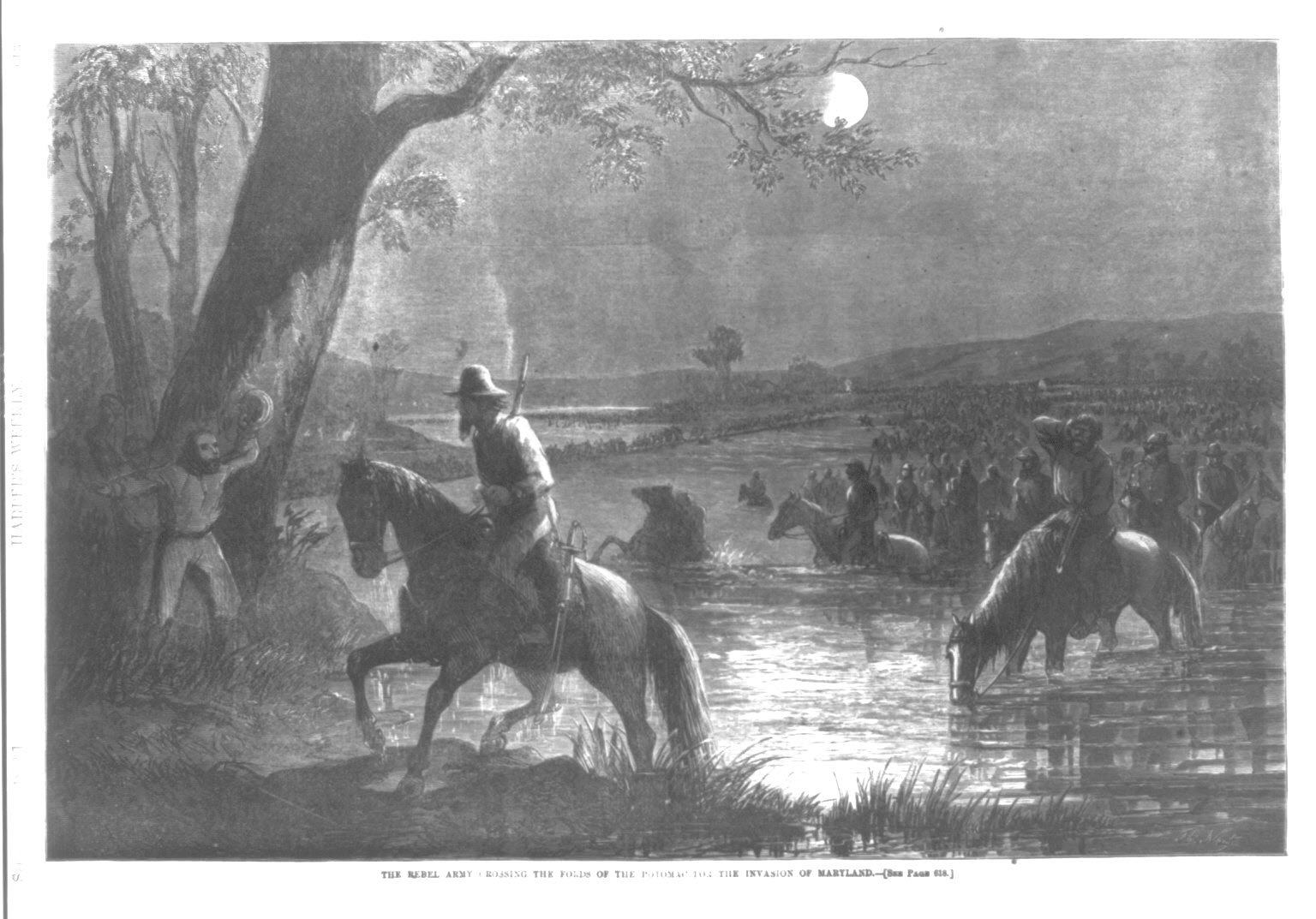
Confederate troops crossing the fords of the Potomac in early September 1862 for the invasion of Maryland, which would culminate in the Battle of Antietam (print of a wood carving based on a drawing by Thomas Nast; first published in the September 27, 1862, edition of Harper's Weekly)

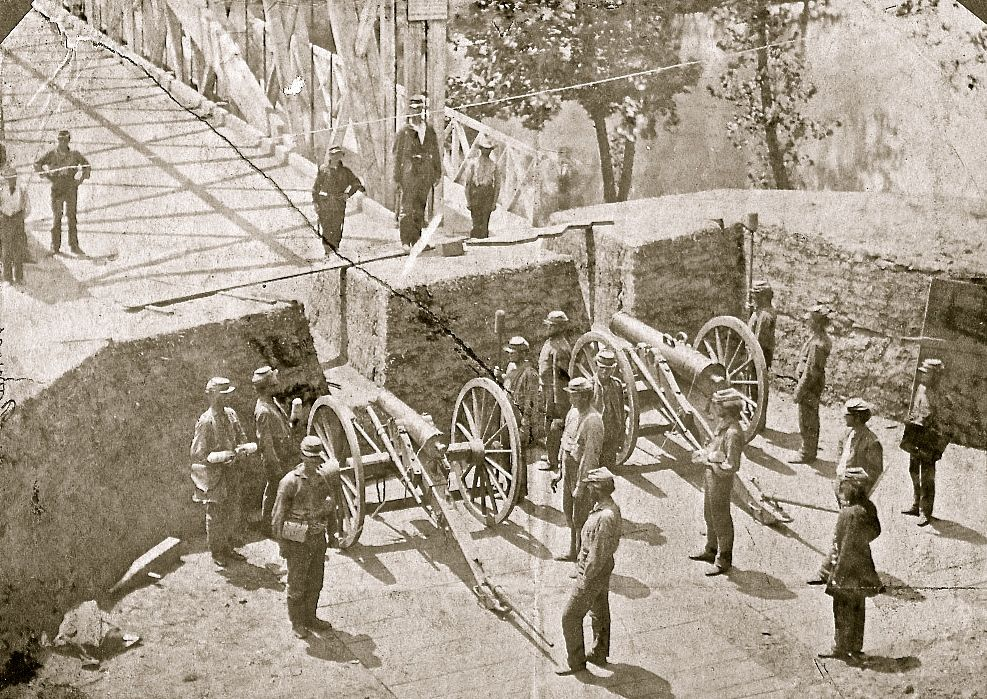
Union soldiers manning the Lower Battery at the north end of Chain Bridge in 1862

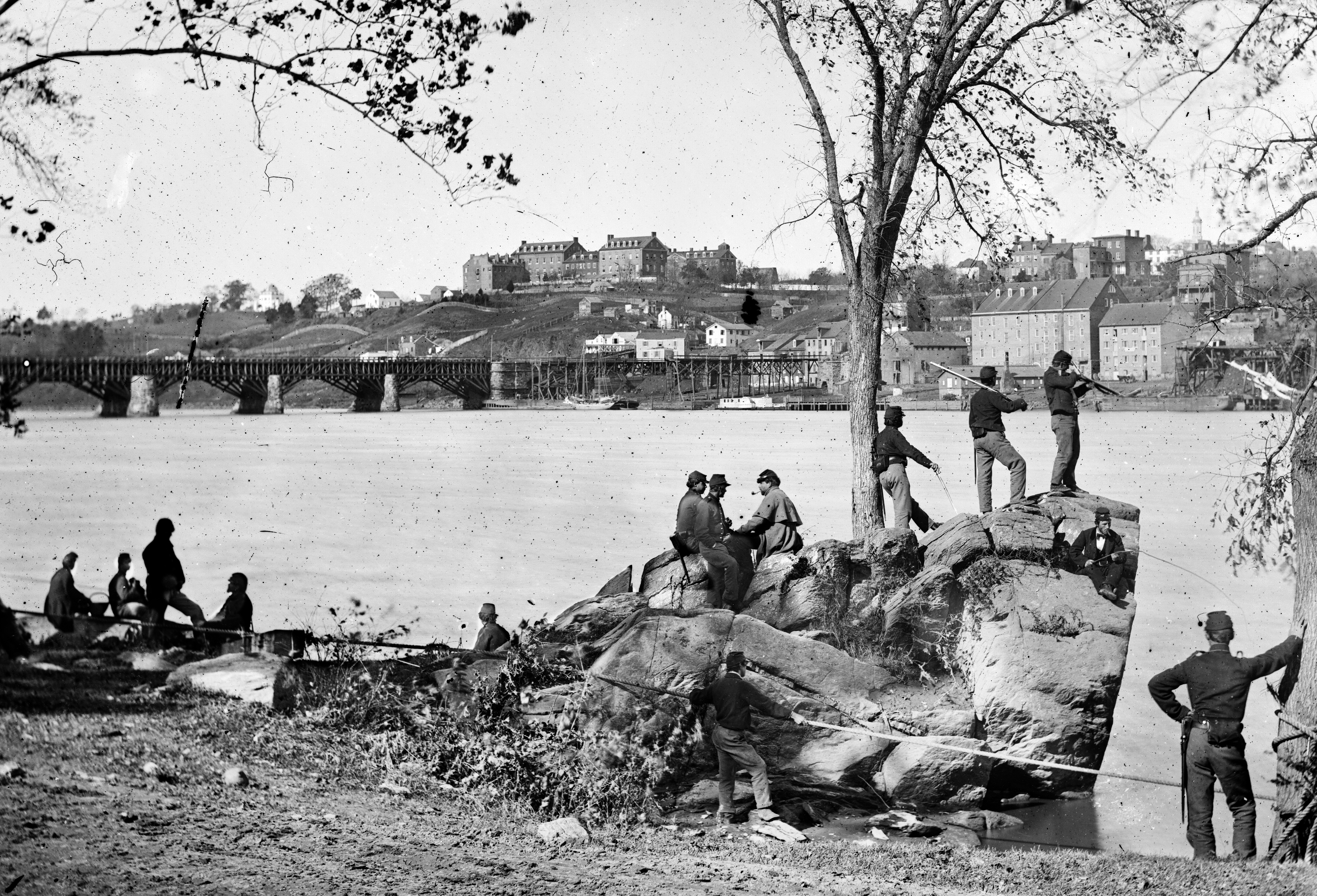
Union soldiers on the Potomac River across from Georgetown University in 1861

Being situated in an area rich in American history and American heritage has led to the Potomac being nicknamed "the Nation's River". George Washington, the first President of the United States, was born in, surveyed, and spent most of his life within, the Potomac basin. There is an apocryphal legend that Washington threw a silver dollar all the way across the river as a youth, even though the first silver dollar wasn't minted until five years before Washington's death.

All of Washington, D.C., the nation's capital city, also lies within the watershed. The First United States Congress by act of July 16, 1790 stated that the nation's capital was to be located on the river. The 1859 siege of Harper's Ferry at the river's confluence with the Shenandoah was a precursor to numerous epic battles of the American Civil War in and around the Potomac and its tributaries, such as the 1861 Battle of Ball's Bluff and the 1862 Battle of Shepherdstown.

General Robert E. Lee crossed the river, thereby invading the North and threatening Washington, D.C., twice in campaigns climaxing in the battles of Antietam (September 17, 1862) and Gettysburg (July 1–3, 1863). Confederate General Jubal Early crossed the river in July 1864 on his attempted raid on the nation's capital. The river not only divided the Union from the Confederacy, but also gave name to the Union's largest army, the Army of the Potomac.

The Patowmack Canal was intended by George Washington to connect the Tidewater region near Georgetown with Cumberland, Maryland. Started in 1785 on the Virginia side of the river, it was not completed until 1802. Financial troubles led to the closure of the canal in 1830. The Chesapeake and Ohio Canal operated along the banks of the Potomac in Maryland from 1831 to 1924 and also connected Cumberland to Washington, D.C. This allowed freight to be transported around the rapids known as the Great Falls of the Potomac River, as well as many other, smaller rapids.

Washington, D.C. began using the Potomac as its principal source of drinking water with the opening of the Washington Aqueduct in 1864, using a water intake constructed at Great Falls.

== Hydrology ==
=== Water supply and water quality ===
An average of approximately 486 million US gallons (1,840,000 m^{3}) of water is withdrawn daily from the Potomac in the Washington area for water supply, providing about 78 percent of the region's total water usage, this amount includes approximately 80 percent of the drinking water consumed by the region's estimated 6.1 million residents.

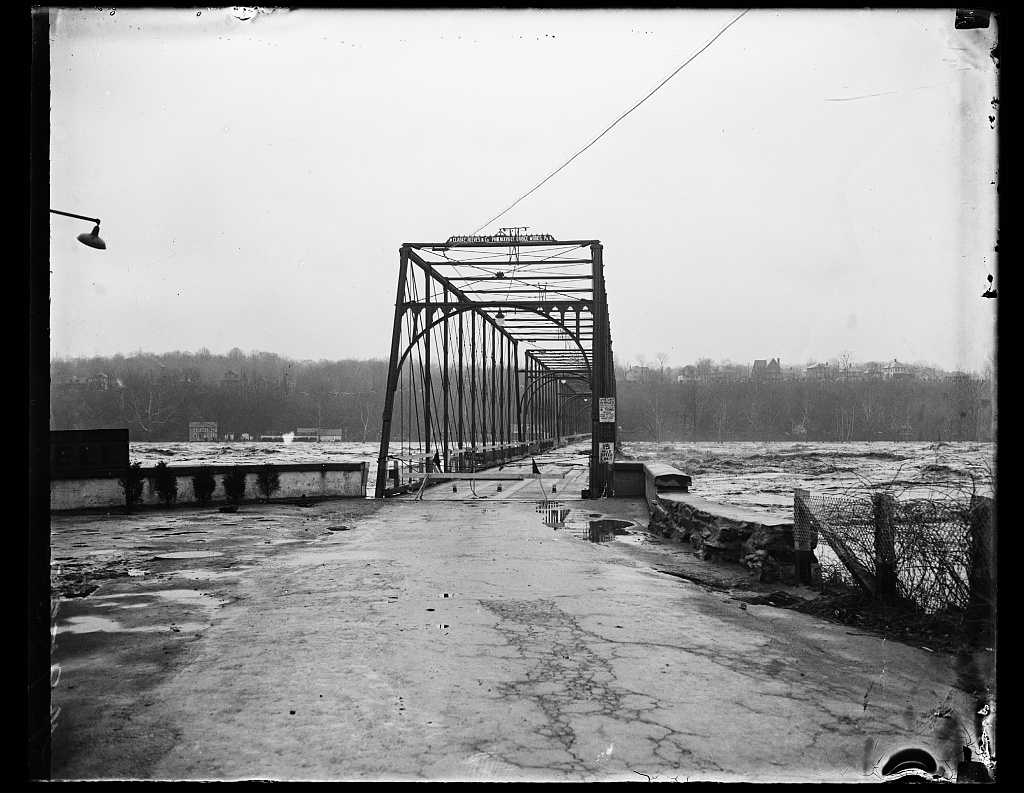
The Potomac River surges over the deck of Chain Bridge during the historic 1936 flood. The bridge was so severely damaged by the raging water, and the debris it carried, that its superstructure had to be re-built; the new bridge was opened to traffic in 1939. (This photograph was taken from a vantage point on Glebe Road in Arlington County, Virginia. The houses on the bluffs in the background are located on the Potomac Palisades of Washington, DC.)

As a result of damaging floods in 1936 and 1937, the Army Corps of Engineers proposed the Potomac River basin reservoir projects, a series of dams that were intended to regulate the river and to provide a more reliable water supply. One dam was to be built at Little Falls, just north of Washington, backing its pool up to Great Falls. Just above Great Falls, the much larger Seneca Dam was proposed whose reservoir would extend to Harpers Ferry. Several other dams were proposed for the Potomac and its tributaries.

Dams on the Potomac River

Operational

- Little Falls Dam (Potomac River) aka Brookmont Dam (at C&O Canal milepost 5.6, upstream of Chain Bridge)
- Potomac Aqueduct Dam (at C&O Canal milepost 17.5, upstream of Great Falls)
- C&O Feeder Dam No. 4 (at C&O Canal milepost 84, downstream of Williamsport, MD)
- Honeywood Dam aka C&O Feeder Dam No. 5 (at C&O Canal milepost 106, upstream of Williamsport, MD)
- Cumberland Dam aka Feeder Dam No. 8 (on North Branch of Potomac River, 40 miles downstream of Fairfax Stone)
- Jennings Randolph Dam (on North Branch of the Potomac River, 27 miles downstream of Fairfax Stone)

Non-Operational

- C&O Feeder Dam No. 1 (C&O Canal milepost 5.6, upstream of Chain Bridge near Lock 6; associated with Little Falls Skirting Canal )
- Seneca Dam aka C&O Feeder Dam No. 2 (at C&O Canal milepost 22, near Violette's Lock)
- Armory Dam aka C&O Feeder Dam No. 3 (at C&O Canal milepost 62, upstream of Harpers Ferry, WV)
- C&O Feeder Dam No. 6 (at C&O Canal milepost 134, west of Hancock, MD)

Planned, but never built

- C&O Feeder Dam No. 7 and Guard Lock No. 7 were proposed to be located near milepost 164, close to the mouth of the South Branch of the Potomac, but were never built due to financial considerations.

When detailed studies were issued by the Corps in the 1950s, they met sustained opposition, led by U.S. Supreme Court Justice William O. Douglas, resulting in the plans' abandonment. The only dam project that did get built was Jennings Randolph Lake on the North Branch. The Corps built a supplementary water intake for the Washington Aqueduct at Little Falls in 1959.

In 1940 Congress passed a law authorizing the creation of an interstate compact to coordinate water quality management among states in the Potomac basin. Maryland, West Virginia, Pennsylvania, Virginia, and the District of Columbia agreed to establish the Interstate Commission on the Potomac River Basin. The compact was amended in 1970 to include coordination of water supply issues and land use issues related to water quality.

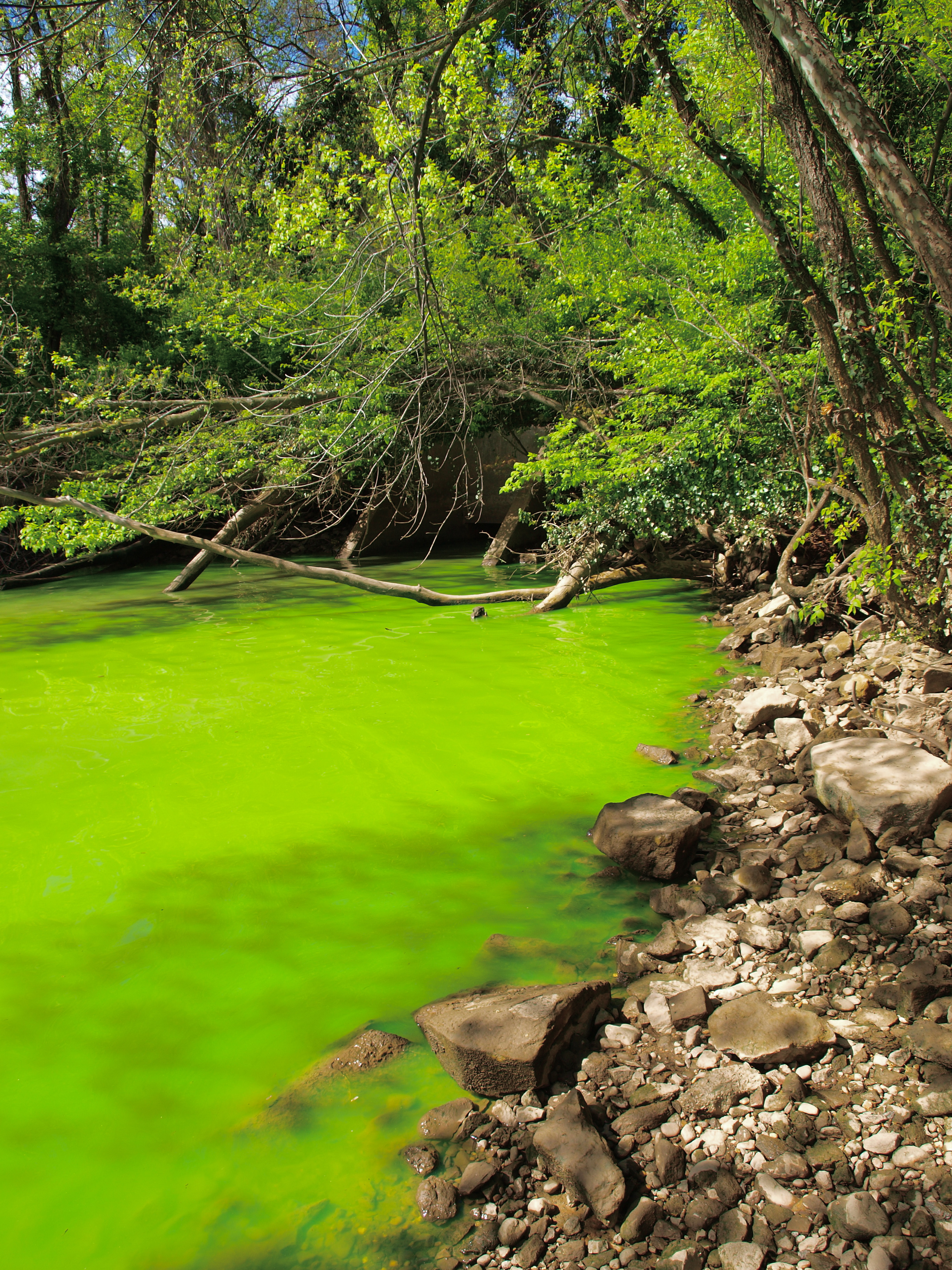
Eutrophication in the Potomac River is evident from this bright green water in Washington, D.C., caused by a dense bloom of cyanobacteria, April 2012.

Beginning in the 19th century, with increasing mining and agriculture upstream and urban sewage and runoff downstream, the water quality of the Potomac River deteriorated. This created conditions of severe eutrophication. It is said that President Abraham Lincoln used to escape to the highlands on summer nights to escape the river's stench. In the 1960s, with dense green algal blooms covering the river's surface, President Lyndon Johnson declared the river "a national disgrace" and set in motion a long-term effort to reduce pollution from sewage and restore the beauty and ecology of this historic river. One of the significant pollution control projects at the time was the expansion of the Blue Plains Advanced Wastewater Treatment Plant, which serves Washington and several surrounding communities.

Enactment of the 1972 Clean Water Act led to construction or expansion of additional sewage treatment plants in the Potomac watershed. Controls on phosphorus, one of the principal contributors to eutrophication, were implemented in the 1980s, through sewage plant upgrades and restrictions on phosphorus in detergents.

By the end of the 20th century, notable success had been achieved, as massive algal blooms vanished and recreational fishing and boating rebounded. Still, the aquatic habitat of the Potomac River and its tributaries remain vulnerable to eutrophication, heavy metals, pesticides and other toxic chemicals, over-fishing, alien species, and pathogens associated with fecal coliform bacteria and shellfish diseases. In 2005 two federal agencies, the US Geological Survey and the Fish and Wildlife Service, began to identify fish in the Potomac and tributaries that exhibited "intersex" characteristics, as a result of endocrine disruption caused by some form of pollution.

On November 13, 2007, the Potomac Conservancy, an environmental group, issued the river a grade of "D-plus", citing high levels of pollution and the reports of "intersex" fish. Since then, the river has improved with a reduction in nutrient runoff, return of fish populations, and land protection along the river. As a result, the group has issued a grade of "B" since 2018. In March 2019, the Potomac Riverkeeper Network launched a laboratory boat dubbed the "Sea Dog", which will be monitoring water quality in the Potomac and providing reports to the public on a weekly basis; in that same month, the catching near Fletcher's Boat House of a Striped Bass estimated to weigh 35 lb (16 kg) was seen as a further indicator of the continuing improvement in the health of the river.

On January 19, 2026, a large sewage pipe, the Potomac Interceptor, ruptured near Lock 10 of the C&O Canal and the Clara Barton Parkway, causing a spill of 300 million gallons into the river. The interceptor sewer originates in the Virginia and Maryland suburbs. One section of the system runs in a reinforced concrete pipe next to the canal, and transports wastewater to the Blue Plains Advanced Wastewater Treatment Plant in Washington. The contamination from the spill is thousands of times higher than what is considered safe for human use. Work has been done to redirect the sewage into a contained part of the canal.

Top Ten Historic Crests of the Potomac River, 1877–2017
Kitzmiller	Hancock	Williamsport	Shepherdstown
Harpers Ferry	Point of Rocks	Little Falls	Georgetown
Source: National Weather Service

=== Discharge ===
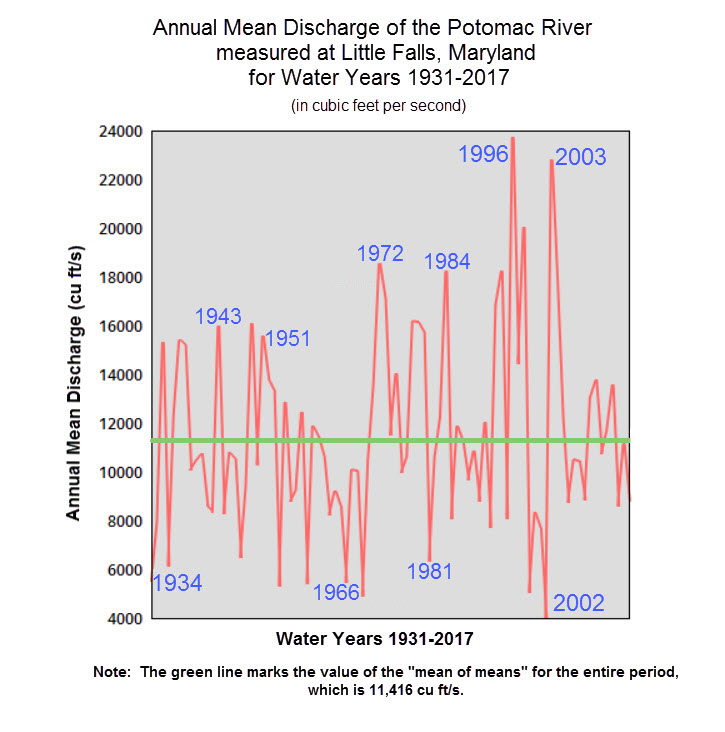
This chart displays the Annual Mean Discharge of the Potomac River measured at Little Falls, Maryland for Water Years 1931–2017 (in cubic feet per second). Source of data: USGS.

The average daily flow during the water years 1931–2018 was 11,498 cubic feet (325.6 m^{3}) /s. The highest average daily flow ever recorded on the Potomac at Little Falls, Maryland (near Washington, D.C.), was in March 1936 when it reached 426,000 cubic feet (12,100 m^{3}) /s. The lowest average daily flow ever recorded at the same location was 601.0 cubic feet (17.02 m^{3}) /s in September 1966.

The highest crest of the Potomac ever registered at Little Falls was 28.10 ft, on March 19, 1936. The most damaging flood to affect Washington, DC and its metropolitan area was in October 1942.

== Legal issues ==
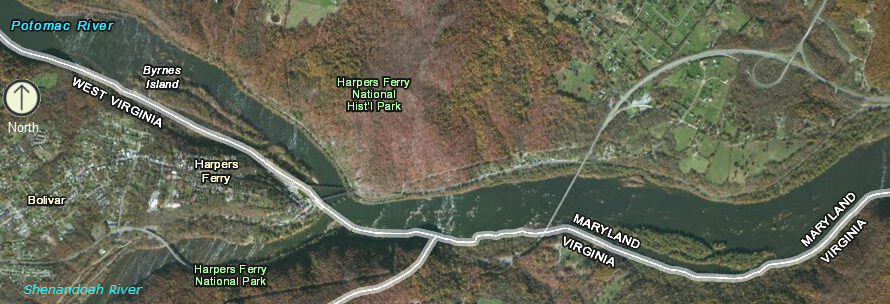
The boundary between Maryland, Virginia, and West Virginia at Harpers Ferry

For 400 years Maryland and Virginia have disputed control of the Potomac and its North Branch since both states' original colonial charters grant the entire river rather than half of it as is normally the case with boundary rivers. In its first state constitution adopted in 1776, Virginia ceded its claim to the entire river but reserved free use of it, an act disputed by Maryland. Both states acceded to the 1785 Mount Vernon Compact and the 1877 Black-Jenkins Award which granted Maryland the river bank-to-bank from the low-water mark on the Virginia side, while permitting Virginia full riparian rights short of obstructing navigation.

From 1957 to 1996, the Maryland Department of the Environment (MDE) routinely issued permits applied for by Virginia entities concerning the use of the Potomac. In 1996, the MDE denied a permit submitted by the Fairfax County Water Authority to build a water intake 725 feet (221 m) offshore, citing potential harm to Maryland's interests by an increase in Virginia sprawl caused by the project.

After years of failed appeals within the Maryland government's appeal processes, in 2000 Virginia took the case to the Supreme Court of the United States, which exercises original jurisdiction in cases between two states. Maryland claimed Virginia lost its riparian rights by acquiescing to MDE's permit process for 63 years. MDE began its permit process in 1933. A Special Master appointed by the Supreme Court to investigate recommended the case be settled in favor of Virginia, citing the language in the 1785 Compact and the 1877 Award. In December 2003, the Court agreed in a 7–2 decision.

The original charters are silent as to which branch from the upper Potomac serves as the boundary, but this was settled by the 1785 Compact. When West Virginia seceded from Virginia in 1863, the question of West Virginia's succession in title to the lands between the branches of the river was raised, as well as title to the river itself. Claims by Maryland to West Virginia land north of the South Branch (all of Mineral and Grant Counties and parts of Hampshire, Hardy, Tucker and Pendleton Counties) and by West Virginia to the Potomac's high-water mark were rejected by the Supreme Court in two separate decisions in 1910.

== Fauna ==
=== Fish ===
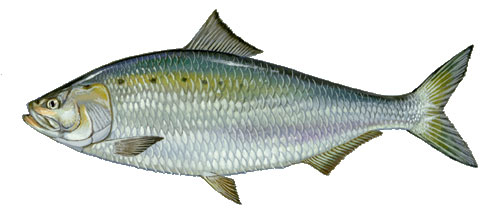
After an absence lasting many decades, the American Shad has recently returned to the Potomac.

A variety of fish inhabit the Potomac, including bass, muskellunge, pike, walleye. The northern snakehead, an invasive species resembling the native bowfin, lamprey, and American eel, was first seen in 2004. Many species of sunfish are also present in the Potomac and its headwaters. Although rare, bull sharks can be found.

After having been depressed for many decades, the river's population of American shad is currently re-bounding as a result of the ICPRB's successful "American Shad Restoration Project" that was begun in 1995. In addition to stocking the river with more than 22 million shad fry, the Project supervised the construction of a fishway that was built to facilitate the passage of adults around the Little Falls Dam on the way to their traditional spawning grounds upstream.

Freshwater fish of the Potomac River

==== Bowfin (Amiidae) ====
- Bowfin Amia calva

==== Catfishes (Ictaluridae) ====
- White bullhead catfish Ameiurus catus
- Yellow bullhead catfish Ameiurus natalis
- Brown bullhead catfish Ameiurus nebulosus
- Channel catfish Ictalurus punctatus
- Tadpole madtom Noturus gyrinus
- Margined madtom Noturus insignis
- Blue catfish*Ictalurus furcatus*
- Flathead catfish*Pylodictis olivaris*

==== Eels (Anguillidae) ====
- American eel Anguilla rostrata

==== Gars (Lepisosteidae) ====
- Longnose gar Lepisosteus osseus

==== Herrings (Clupeidae) ====
- Blueback herring Alosa aestivalis
- Hickory shad Alosa mediocris
- Alewife Alosa pseudoharengus
- American shad Alosa sapidissima
- Gizzard shad Dorosoma cepedianum
- Threadfin shad Dorosoma petenense

==== Killifishes (Fundulidae) ====
- Banded killifish Fundulus diaphanus
- Mummichog killifish Fundulus heteroclitus
- Spotfin killifish Fundulus luciae
- Striped killifish Fundulus majalis
- Rainwater killifish Lucania parva

==== Pupfish (Cyprinodontidae) ====
- Sheepshead minnow Cyprinodon variegatus

==== Lampreys (Petromyzontidae) ====
- Least brook lamprey Lampetra aepyptera
- American brook lamprey Lampetra appendix
- Sea lamprey Petromyzon marinus

==== Minnows (Cyprinidae) ====
- Central stoneroller Campostoma anomalum
- Goldfish Carassius auratus
- Redside dace Clinostomus elongatus
- Rosyside dace Clinostomus funduloides
- Grass carp Ctenopharyngodon idella
- Satinfin shiner Cyprinella analostana
- Spotfin shiner Cyprinella spiloptera
- Common carp Cyprinus carpio
- Cutlips minnow Exoglossum maxillingua
- Eastern silvery minnow Hybognathus regius
- Striped shiner Luxilus chrysocephalus
- Common shiner Luxilus cornutus
- Allegheny pearl dace Margariscus margarita
- River chub Nocomis micropogon
- Golden shiner Notemigonus crysoleucas
- Comely shiner Notropis amoenus
- Emerald shiner Notropis atherinoides
- Bridle shiner Notropis bifrenatus
- Silverjaw minnow Notropis buccatus
- Ironcolor shiner Notropis chalybaeus
- Spottail shiner Notropis hudsonius
- Swallowtail shiner Notropis procne
- Rosyface shiner Notropis rubellus
- Bluntnose minnow Pimephales notatus
- Fathead minnow Pimephales promelas
- Eastern blacknose dace Rhinichthys atratulus
- Longnose dace Rhinichthys cataractae
- Creek chub Semotilus atromaculatus
- Fallfish Semotilus corporalis
- Bluehead chub Nocomis leptocephalus
- Mimic shiner Notropis volucellus

==== Mudminnows (Umbridae) ====
- Eastern mudminnow Umbra pygmaea

==== Perches (Percidae) ====
- Greenside darter Etheostoma blennioides
- Rainbow darter Etheostoma caeruleum
- Fantail darter Etheostoma flabellare
- Swamp darter Etheostoma fusiforme
- Johnny darter Etheostoma nigrum
- Tessellated darter Etheostoma olmstedi
- Glassy darter Etheostoma vitreum
- Banded darter Etheostoma zonale
- Yellow perch Perca flavescens
- Common logperch Percina caprodes
- Stripeback darter Percina notogramma
- Shield darter Percina peltata
- Walleye Sander vitreum

==== Percopsids (Percopsidae) ====
- Trout-perch Percopsis omiscomaycus

==== Pikes (Esocidae) ====
- Redfin pickerel Esox americanus
- Northern pike Esox lucius
- Muskellunge Esox masquinongy
- Chain pickerel Esox niger

==== Pirate perch (Aphredoderidae) ====
- Pirate perch Aphredoderus sayanus

==== Poeciliids (Poeciliidae) ====
- Eastern mosquitofish Gambusia holbrooki
- Guppy Poecilia reticulata

==== Pupfish (Cyprinodontidae) ====
- Sheepshead minnow Cyprinodon variegatus

==== Sculpins (Cottidae) ====
- Mottled sculpin Cottus bairdii
- Blue Ridge sculpin Cottus caeruleomentum
- Potomac sculpin Cottus girardi

==== Silversides (Atherinopsidae) ====
- Inland silverside Menidia beryllina

==== Smelts (Osmeridae) ====
- Rainbow smelt Osmerus mordax

==== Snakeheads (Channidae) ====
- Northern snakehead*Channa argus*

==== Sturgeons (Acipenseridae) ====
- Shortnose sturgeon Acipenser brevirostrum
- Atlantic sturgeon Acipenser oxyrhinchus

==== Suckers (Catostomidae) ====
- Quillback Carpiodes cyprinus
- White sucker Catostomus commersoni
- Creek chubsucker Erimyzon oblongus
- Northern hogsucker Hypentelium nigricans
- Golden redhorse Moxostoma erythrurum
- Shorthead redhorse Moxostoma macrolepidotum
- Torrent sucker Thoburnia rhothoeca

==== Sunfishes (Centrarchidae) ====
- Mud sunfish Acantharcus pomotis
- Rock bass Amblopites rupestris
- Flier sunfish Centrarchus macropterus
- Blackbanded sunfish Enneacanthus chaetodon
- Bluespotted sunfish Enneacanthus gloriosus
- Banded sunfish Enneacanthus obesus
- Redbreast sunfish Lepomis auritus
- Green sunfish Lepomis cyanellus
- Pumpkinseed sunfish Lepomis gibbosus
- Warmouth sunfish Lepomis gulosus
- Bluegill sunfish Lepomis macrochirus
- Longear sunfish Lepomis megalotis
- Redear sunfish Lepomis microlophus
- Smallmouth bass Micropterus dolomieu
- Largemouth bass Micropterus salmoides
- White crappie Pomoxis annularis
- Black crappie Pomoxis nigromaculatus

==== Temperate basses (Moronidae) ====
- White perch Morone americana
- Striped bass Morone saxatilis

==== Trout and whitefish (Salmonidae) ====
- Rainbow trout (Oncorhynchus mykiss)
- Brown trout (Salmo trutta)

*denotes naturalized species;

Sources:

- Dnr.state.md: Fish key of native species
- http://www.potomacriver.org/wp-content/uploads/2014/11/MasterFreshFishList0213.pdf

Tidal freshwater fish of the Potomac River

==== Mullets (Mugilidae) ====
Striped mullet Mugil cephalus

==== Drums (Sciaenidae) ====
Spot Leiostomus xanthurus

Spotted seatrout Cynoscion nebulosus

Atlantic Croaker Micropogonias undulatus

Red drum Sciaenops ocellata

==== Soles (Soleidae) ====
Hogchoker Trinectes maculatus

==== Sharks (Carcharhinidae) ====
Bull shark Carcharhinus leucas

Sources:

- Dnr.state.md: Fish key of native species
- http://www.potomacriver.org/wp-content/uploads/2014/11/MasterFreshFishList0213.pdf

=== Mammals ===
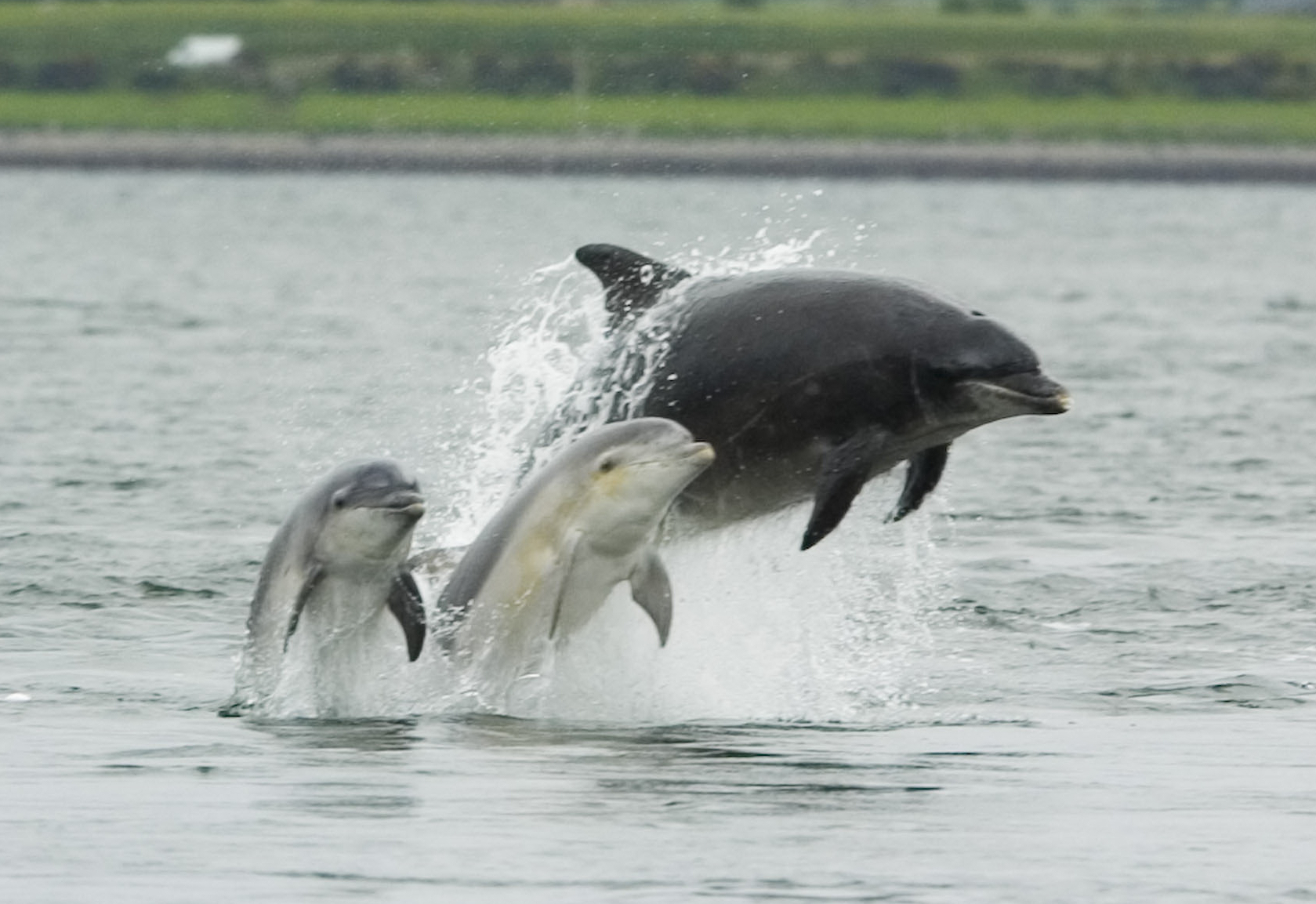
Several hundred bottle-nosed dolphins live six months of the year (from mid-April through mid-October) in the Potomac. Depicted here, a mother with her young.

Mammals of the Potomac River Basin

- Bats
  - Little brown bat Myotis lucifugus
  - Indiana bat Myotis sodalis
  - Eastern small-footed bat Myotis leibii
  - Northern long-eared bat Myotis septentrionalis
  - Silver-haired bat Lasionycteris noctivagans
  - Tricolored bat Perimyotis subflavus
  - Big brown bat Eptesicus fuscus
  - Red bat Lasiurus borealis
  - Hoary bat Lasiurus cinereus
  - Evening bat Nycticeius humeralis
- Bears
  - American black bear Ursus americanus
- Beavers
  - American beaver Castor canadensis
- Cats
  - Bobcat Lynx rufus
  - Cougar, Puma concolor extirpated
    - Eastern cougar, P. c. couguar extinct
- Canids
  - Red fox Vulpes vulpes
  - Gray fox Urocyon cinereoargenteus
  - Coyote Canis latrans
  - Eastern wolf Canis lycaon extirpated
  - Red wolf Canis rufus extirpated
- Ungulates
  - Sika deer*Cervus nippon *
  - Elk Cervus canadensis reintroduced
    - Eastern elk C. c. canadensis extinct
    - Rocky Mountain elk C. c. canadensis introduced
  - White-tailed deer Odocoileus virginianus
  - American bison Bison bison extirpated
- Jumping mice
  - Meadow jumping mouse Zapus hudsonius
  - Woodland jumping mouse Napaeozapus insignis
- Lemmings
  - Southern bog lemming Synaptomys cooperi
- Marine Mammals
  - Bottlenose dolphin Tursiops truncatus
- Moles
  - Hairy-tailed mole Parascalops breweri
  - Eastern mole Scalopus aquaticus
  - Southeastern star-nosed mole Condylura cristata parva
- Muskrats
  - Muskrat Ondatra zibethicus
- New World Mice and Rats
  - Marsh rice rat Oryzomys palustris
  - Deer mouse Peromyscus maniculatus
  - White-footed deer mouse Peromyscus leucopus
  - Allegheny woodrat Neotoma magister
- Nutria
  - Nutria*Myocastor coypus*
- Old World mice and rats
  - Black rat*Rattus rattus*
  - Norway rat*Rattus norvegicus*
  - House mouse*Mus musculus*
- Opossums
  - Virginia opossum Didelphis virginiana
- Porcupines
  - Porcupine Erethizon dorsatum
- Rabbits and Hares
  - Eastern cottontail Sylvilagus floridanus
  - Appalachian cottontail Sylvilagus obscurus
- Raccoons
  - Raccoon Procyon lotor
- Shrews
  - Masked shrew Sorex cinereus
  - Southeastern shrew Sorex longirostris
  - Southern water shrew Sorex palustris punctulatus
  - Smoky shrew Sorex fumeus
  - Long-tailed shrew Sorex dispar
  - Southern pygmy shrew Sorex hoyi winnemana
  - Northern short-tailed shrew Blarina brevicauda
  - Least shrew Cryptotis parva
- Skunks
  - Eastern spotted skunk Spilogale putorius
  - Striped skunk Mephitis mephitis
- Squirrels and chipmunks
  - Eastern chipmunk Tamias striatus
  - Groundhog (aka Woodchuck) Marmota monax
  - Eastern gray squirrel Sciurus carolinensis
  - Eastern fox squirrel Sciurus niger
    - Delmarva fox squirrel S. n. cinereus
  - Red squirrel Tamiasciurus hudsonicus
  - Southern flying squirrel Glaucomys volans
- Voles
  - Southern red-backed vole Clethrionomys gapperi
  - Meadow vole Microtus pennsylvanicus
  - Southern rock vole Microtus chrotorrhinus carolinensis
  - Woodland vole Microtus pinetorum
- Mustelids
  - Fisher Pekania pennanti
  - Least weasel Mustela nivalis
  - American ermine Mustela richardsonii
  - Long-tailed weasel Neogale frenata
  - American mink Neogale vison
  - Northern river otter Lontra canadensis

*denotes introduced species

Sources:

- Mammals of Maryland; Maryland Department of Natural Resources. Retrieved February 8, 2018.]
- Wildlife Information; Virginia Department of Wildlife Resources. Retrieved July 4, 2020.
- Mammals of West Virginia: A Field Checklist (2001); West Virginia Division of Natural Resources, Wildlife Resources Section. Retrieved February 8, 2018.]

Early European colonists who settled along the Potomac found a diversity of large and small mammals living in the dense forests nearby. Bison, elk, wolves (both Eastern and red) and cougars were still present at that time, but had been hunted to extirpation by the middle of the 19th century. Among the denizens of the Potomac's banks, beavers and otters met a similar fate, while small populations of American mink and American martens survived into the 20th century in some secluded areas.

There is no record of early settlers having observed marine mammals in the Potomac, but several sightings of Atlantic bottle-nosed dolphins (Tursiops truncatus) were reported during the 19th century. In July 1844, a pod of 14 adults and young was followed up the river by men in boats as high as the Aqueduct Bridge (approximately the same location occupied by Key Bridge today).

Since 2015, perhaps as a result of warmer temperatures, rising water levels in the Chesapeake Bay and improving water quality in the Potomac, unprecedented numbers of Atlantic bottle-nosed dolphins have been observed in the river. According to Dr. Janet Mann of Georgetown University's Potomac-Chesapeake Dolphin Project, more than 500 individual members of the species have been identified in the Potomac during this period.

=== Birds ===
Birds of the Potomac River Basin

=== Reptiles ===
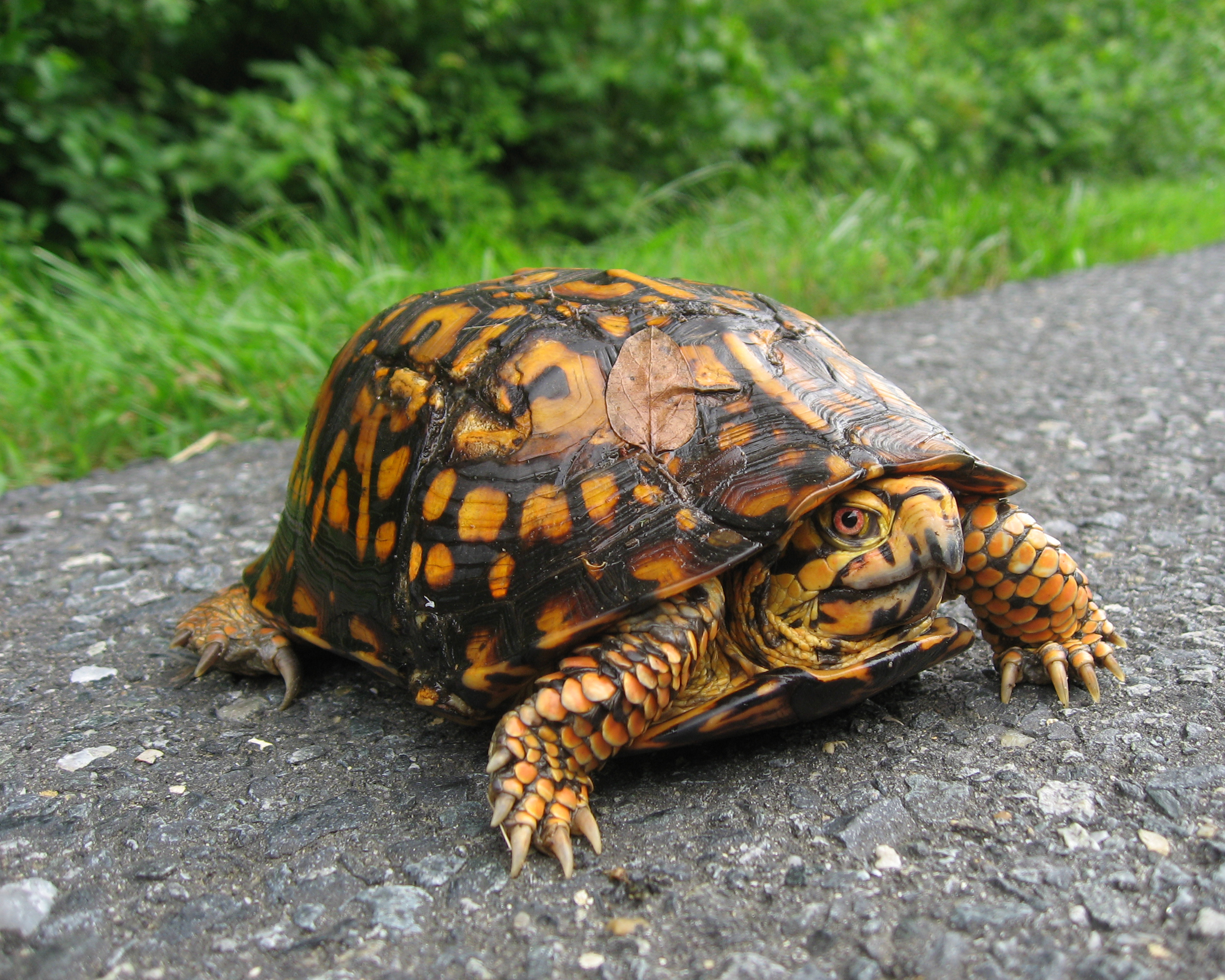
Eastern box turtles are frequently spotted along the towpath of the C&O Canal.

Turtles of the Potomac River Basin

Bog (=Muhlenberg) turtle Glyptemys (=Clemmys) muhlenbergii

Chinese softshell turtle *Pelodiscus sinensis *

Coastal plain cooter Pseudemys concinna floridana

Cumberland slider Trachemys scripta troostii

Eastern box turtle Terrapene carolina carolina

Eastern chicken turtle Deirochelys reticularia reticularia

Eastern mud turtle Kinosternon subrubrum subrubrum

Eastern musk turtle Sternotherus odoratus

Eastern painted turtle Chrysemys picta picta

Eastern river cooter Pseudemys concinna concinna

Eastern spiny softshell turtle Apalone spinifera spinifera

Green sea turtle Chelonia mydas

Gulf Coast spiny softshell turtle *Apalone spinifera aspera *

Hawksbill sea turtle Eretmochelys imbricata

Kemp's ridley sea turtle Lepidochelys kempii

Leatherback sea turtle Dermochelys coriacea

Loggerhead sea turtle Caretta caretta

Mississippi map turtle*Graptemys pseudogeographica kohnii *

Northern map turtle Graptemys geographica

Northern diamond-backed terrapin Malaclemys terrapin terrapin

Northern red-bellied cooter Pseudemys rubriventris

Red-eared slider *Trachemys scripta elegans *

Snapping turtle Chelydra serpentina

Spotted turtle Clemmys guttata

Striped mud turtle Kinosternon baurii

Stripe-necked musk turtle Sternotherus minor peltifer

Wood turtle Glyptemys insculpta

Yellow-bellied slider Trachemys scripta scripta

*denotes naturalized species

https://dwr.virginia.gov/wp-content/uploads/virginia-native-naturalized-species.pdf
http://dnr.maryland.gov/wildlife/Documents/herpchecklist.pdf

Snakes of the Potomac River basin

Northern copperhead Agkistrodon contortrix mokasen

Timber rattlesnake Crotalus horridus

Northern watersnake Nerodia sipedon sipedon

Red-bellied watersnake Nerodia erythrogaster erythrogaster

Queen snake Regina septemvittata

Eastern smooth earthsnake Virginia valeriae valeriae

Mountain earthsnake Virginia valeriae pulchra

Northern brown snake Storeria dekayi dekayi

Northern Red-bellied Snake Storeria occipitomaculata occipitomaculata

Eastern garter snake Thamnophis sirtalis sirtalis

Common ribbonsnake Thamnophis sauritus sauritus

Southern ring-necked snake Diadophis punctatus punctatus

Northern ring-necked snake Diadophis punctatus edwardsi

Eastern worm snake Carphophis amoenus amoenus

Smooth green snake Opheodrys vernalis

Northern rough greensnake Opheodrys aestivus aestivus

Eastern hog-nosed snake Heterodon platirhinos

Rainbow snake Farancia erytrogramma erytrogramma

Northern Black Racer Coluber constrictor constrictor

Red cornsnake Pantherophis guttatus

Eastern ratsnake Pantherophis alleghaniensis

Mole kingsnake Lampropeltis calligaster rhombomaculata

Eastern kingsnake Lampropeltis getula getula

Eastern kilksnake Lampropeltis triangulum triangulum

Coastal Plain Milksnake Lampropeltis triangulum elapsoides

Northern scarletsnake Cemophora coccinea copei

http://dnr.maryland.gov/wildlife/Documents/herpchecklist.pdf
A Guide to the Snakes of Virginia (Virginia Department of Game and Inland Fisheries, Wildlife Diversity Division, Special Publication No. 2.1) 2002; by Michael J Pinder (Author)

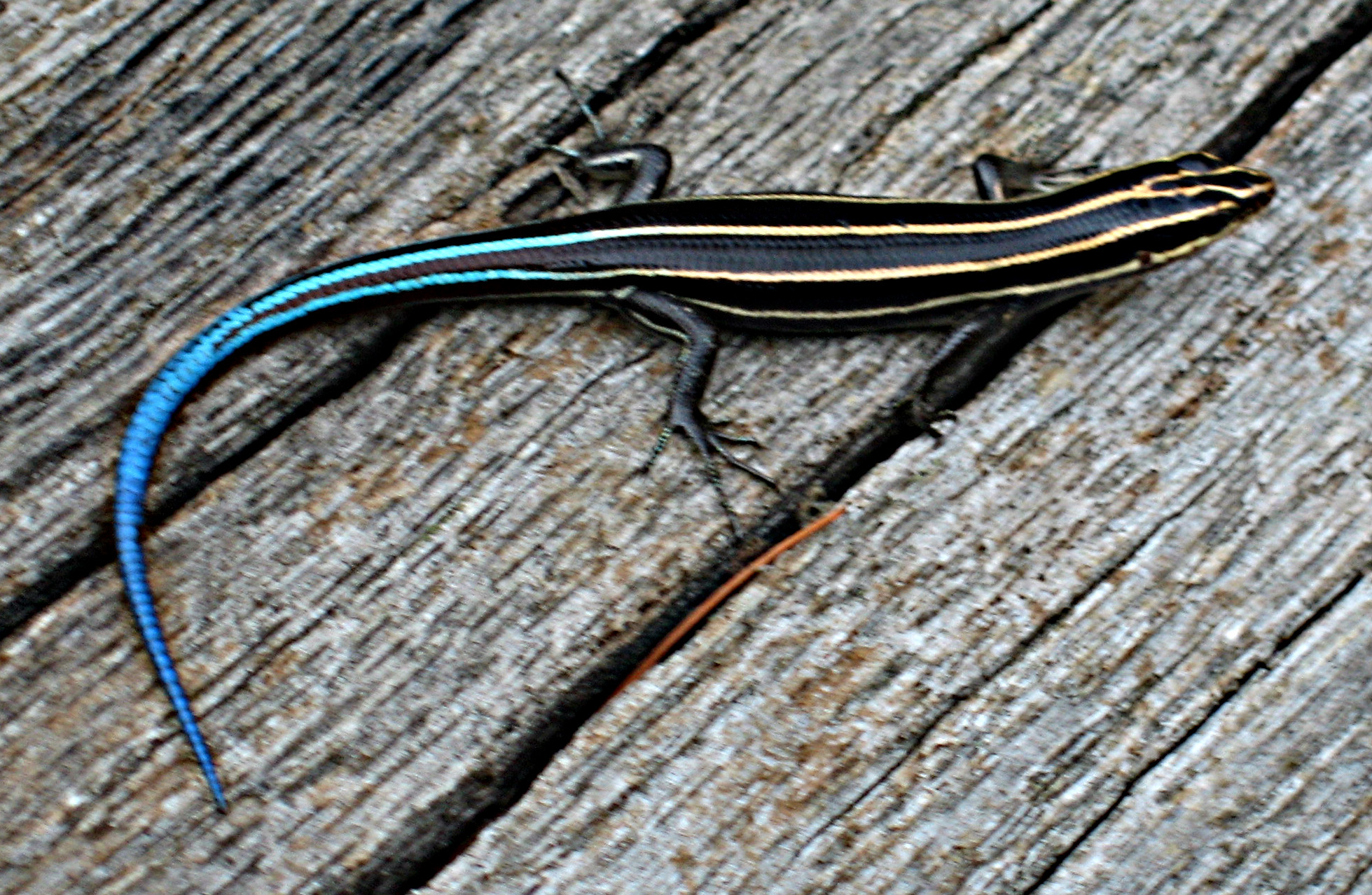
Five-lined skink, juvenile

Lizards of the Potomac River Basin

Eastern Fence Lizard Sceloporus undulatus

Eastern Six-lined Racerunner Aspidoscelis sexlineata sexlineata

Little Brown Skink Scincella lateralis

Northern Coal Skink Plestiodon anthracinus anthracinus

Common Five-lined Skink Plestiodon fasciatus

Broad-headed Skink Plestiodon laticeps

Sources:

- https://dwr.virginia.gov/wp-content/uploads/virginia-native-naturalized-species.pdf
- http://dnr.maryland.gov/wildlife/Documents/herpchecklist.pdf

=== Amphibians ===
Salamanders of the Potomac River Basin

Common Mudpuppy Necturus maculosus maculosus

Eastern Hellbender Cryptobranchus alleganiensis alleganiensis

Marbled Salamander Ambystoma opacum

Jefferson Salamander Ambystoma jeffersonianum

Spotted Salamander Ambystoma maculatum

Eastern Tiger Salamander Ambystoma tigrinum tigrinum

Red-spotted Newt Notophthalmus viridescens viridescens

Eastern Red-backed Salamander Plethodon cinereus

Wehrle's Salamander Plethodon wehrlei

Northern slimy salamander Plethodon glutinosus

Valley and ridge salamander Plethodon hoffmani

Seal Salamander Desmognathus monticola monticola

Northern Dusky Salamander Desmognathus fuscus

Allegheny Mountain Dusky Salamander Desmognathus ochrophaeus

Northern Red Salamander Pseudotriton ruber ruber

Eastern Mud Salamander Pseudotriton montanus montanus

Northern Spring Salamander Gyrinophilus porphyriticus porphyriticus

Northern Two-lined Salamander Eurycea bislineata

Southern Two-lined Salamander Eurycea cirrigera

Long-tailed salamander Eurycea longicauda longicauda

Four-toed Salamander Hemidactylium scutatum

Green Salamander Aneides aeneus

Sources:

- https://dwr.virginia.gov/wp-content/uploads/virginia-native-naturalized-species.pdf
- http://dnr.maryland.gov/wildlife/Documents/herpchecklist.pdf

Frogs and toads of the Potomac River Basin

Upland Chorus Frog Pseudacris feriarum

New Jersey Chorus Frog Pseudacris kalmi

Northern Spring Peeper Pseudacris crucifer

Mountain Chorus Frog Pseudacris brachyphona

Eastern Cricket Frog Acris crepitans crepitans

Green Treefrog Hyla cinerea

Gray Treefrog Hyla versicolor

Cope's Gray Treefrog Hyla chrysoscelis

Barking Treefrog Hyla gratiosa

Carpenter Frog Lithobates virgatipes

Wood Frog Lithobates sylvaticus

Northern Leopard Frog*Lithobates pipiens*

Southern Leopard Frog Lithobates sphenocephalus utricularius

Pickerel Frog Lithobates palustris

Northern Green Frog Lithobates clamitans melanota

American Bullfrog Lithobates catesbeiana

Eastern spadefoot toad Scaphiopus holbrookii

Eastern American Toad Anaxyrus americanus americanus

Fowler's Toad Anaxyrus fowleri

Eastern Narrow-mouthed Toad Gastrophryne carolinensis

*denotes naturalized species

Sources:

- https://dwr.virginia.gov/wp-content/uploads/virginia-native-naturalized-species.pdf
- http://dnr.maryland.gov/wildlife/Documents/herpchecklist.pdf

== See also ==
- List of cities and towns along the Potomac River
- List of crossings of the Potomac River
- List of islands on the Potomac River
- List of rivers of Maryland
- List of rivers of Virginia
- List of rivers of West Virginia
- List of tributaries of the Potomac River
- Potomac Heritage Trail
- Air Florida Flight 90, a flight crashed into Potomac River just after takeoff from Washington National Airport
- 2025 Potomac River mid-air collision, an American Eagle Bombardier CRJ701ER collided with a Sikorsky VH-60M Black Hawk, both crashed into Potomac River on January 29, 2025.

== Notes ==
- AQU: The diversion dam at Great Falls, often called the "Aqueduct Dam", was built in the 1850s by the US Army Corps of Engineers as part of the project assigned to them by Congress to supply clean water from above Great Falls to Washington, DC. Water diverted by the dam flows 12 miles through a 9-foot diameter pipeline to Dalecarlia Reservoir on the outskirts of the city where it is first allowed to settle and then filtered and purified before being distributed to consumers. Since 1927, potable water from Dalecarlia has also been provided to Arlington County and some other sections of nearby northern Virginia through three 20-inch diameter pipelines that cross the Potomac under the deck of Chain Bridge. In addition, there is nearby a 4-foot diameter conduit constructed in 1967 that traverses the Potomac beneath the riverbed which is used primarily for backup purposes.
- GHL: "Evidence of the ancient Potomac River bed can be seen in well-rounded boulders, smoothed surfaces and grooves, and beautifully formed potholes. Look for sandstone boulders along the trail, which were deposited by massive floods. The sandy soils along the river trail, with shells mixed in, are a result of sediment deposits from floods. Some of the oldest sediment deposits in the area can be found on Glade Hill, between the Matildaville and Carriage Road trails. Glade Hill was once an island in the Potomac River, and the deposits found there were left before Mather Gorge formed."
- PIF: "In the Late Pennsylvanian, the rocks of the Stubblefield Falls domain of the Mather Gorge Formation moved up relative to the Sykesville Formation on the steep, west-dipping Plummers Island fault and mylonite zones (Schoenborn, 2001) within an existing Plummers Island shear zone (figs. 5, 6). Shearing formed S2 cleavage with below-closure muscovite growth and more pervasive S2 cleavage in the Sykesville Formation. By the earliest Permian, all of the rocks in the Potomac terrane had cooled through 235°C (figs. 3, 5). Apatite fission-track data indicate cooling through ≈90°C to 100°C in Early Jurassic to Early Cretaceous time, with increasing ages to the east, suggesting kilometer-scale rotation of the Potomac terrane in the Cretaceous and (or) Tertiary, with the west side up."
- BLK: "Two samples collected from the terrace dissected by Great Falls indicate that the Falls were established in their current location by 30 ky. A series of 6 samples taken from a vertical transect just below the falls, indicates that vertical incision continued a rate of 0.5 m/ky between 27 and 12 ky, increasing to nearly 1.0 m/ky during the Holocene. These data suggest that the drop over Great Falls is growing with time. A dramatic increase in outcrop weathering and soil depth 3.5 km downstream of the Falls, suggests that prior to establishment of the Great Falls knickzone, a similar feature was likely present near Black Pond. 10-Be data are not yet available for this paleo knick zone; however, a 10-Be model age >200 ky from the top of Plummers island 5 km down stream of Black Pond suggests a much older period of retreat led to the formation of the Black Pond paleo knick zone."
- PES: "The Potomac Estuary: From the Chain Bridge in Washington, DC, to Point Lookout at the confluence with the Chesapeake Bay, the Potomac Estuary is a long and narrow estuary—approximately 189 km. With its many tributaries and bays, however, the Potomac Estuary has a shoreline of 1,800 km. The Estuary meanders in a south, southeasterly direction, except for a sharp bend about halfway downriver. The Estuary has three well-defined and distinct zones. The upper zone, from Chain Bridge to Indian Head, is the tidal freshwater reach, with salinities of less than 0.5 parts per thousand (ppt). The middle reach, between Indian Head and the Route 301 Bridge at Morgantown, is the transition zone. The salinity of this zone varies from 0.5 to 7.0 ppt and is often referred to as the zone of maximum turbidity. The lower zone, from the 301 Bridge to Point Lookout, has salinities ranging from 7 to 16 ppt."
- TRI: The rocky western (upriver) and central portions of the island are part of the Piedmont Plateau, while the southeastern part is within the Atlantic Coastal Plain. At one point opposite Georgetown, the Atlantic Seaboard fall line between the Piedmont and the Coastal Plain can be seen as a natural phenomenon. The island has about 2.5-mile (4.0 km) of shoreline, and the highest area of the island (where the Mason mansion stood) is about 44 feet (13 m) above sea level.
