= Power Plant and Dam No. 4 =

- U.S. National Register of Historic Places
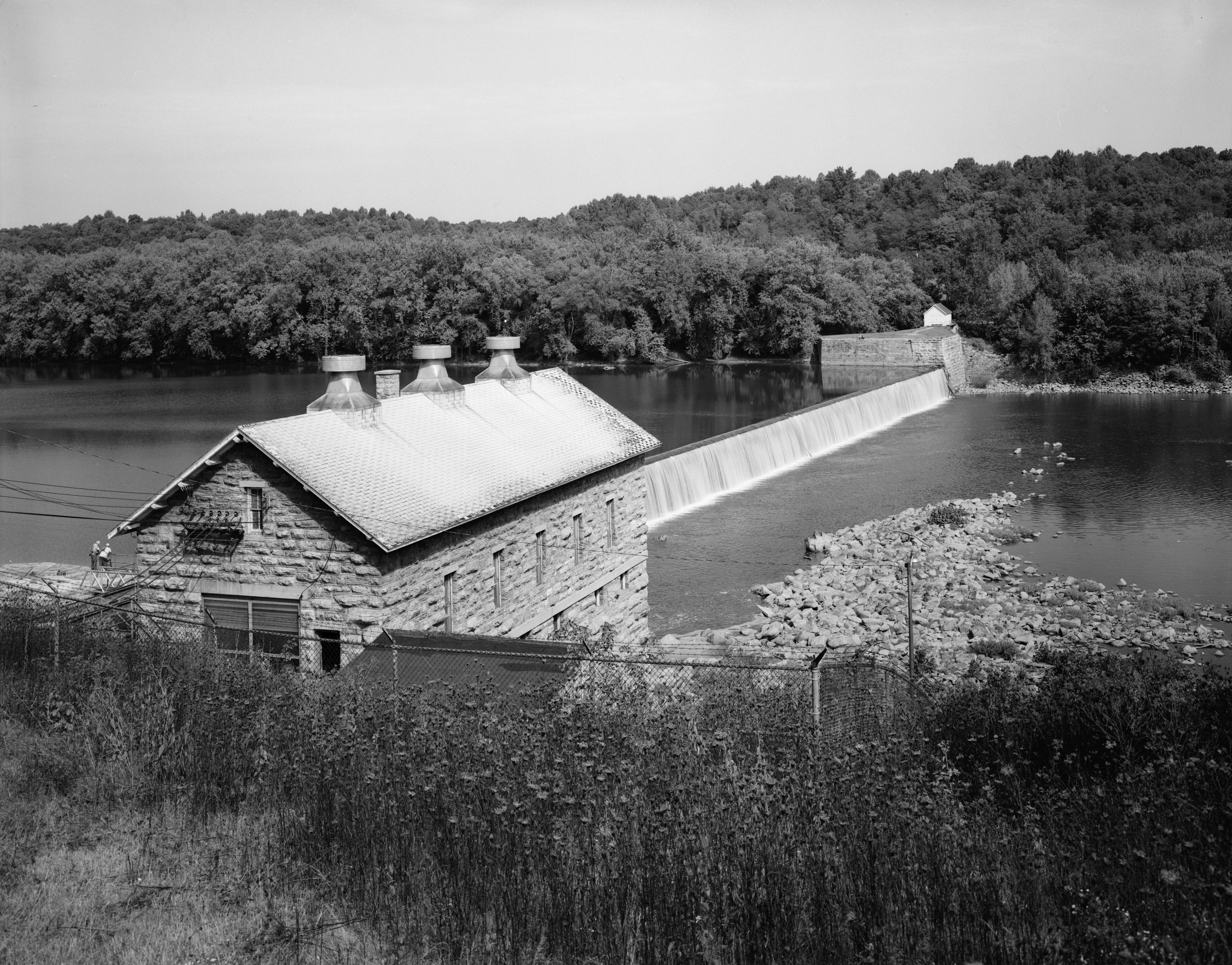
- Power Plant and Dam No. 4, September 1980

- Location within West Virginia Location within the United States
- Location: On the Potomac River north of County Route 5 at Scrabble, near Shepherdstown, West Virginia
- Coordinates: 39°29′42″N 77°49′34″W
- Area: 6 acres (2.4 ha)
- Built: 1910
- MPS: Berkeley County MRA
- NRHP reference No.: 80004437
- Added to NRHP: December 10, 1980

Power Plant and Dam No. 4 is a historic hydroelectric power generation station on the Potomac River, located near Shepherdstown on the county line between Berkeley and Jefferson County, West Virginia. The power plant is a tall one-story, limestone building on a high stone foundation. It is five bays long and has a gable roof. Dam 4 uses horizontal shaft turbines connected by rope drives to horizontal shaft generators. This plant is probably the last commercially operated rope-driven hydroelectric plant in the United States. The building is built into a hillside, so the main floor is the top floor. The power plant was originally built by the Martinsburg Electric Company.

It was listed on the National Register of Historic Places in 1980.

In 2013, the power plant was sold by FirstEnergy to Harbor Hydro Holdings LLC. The power plant has a rated capacity of 1.9 megawatts.

== Building the Dam ==
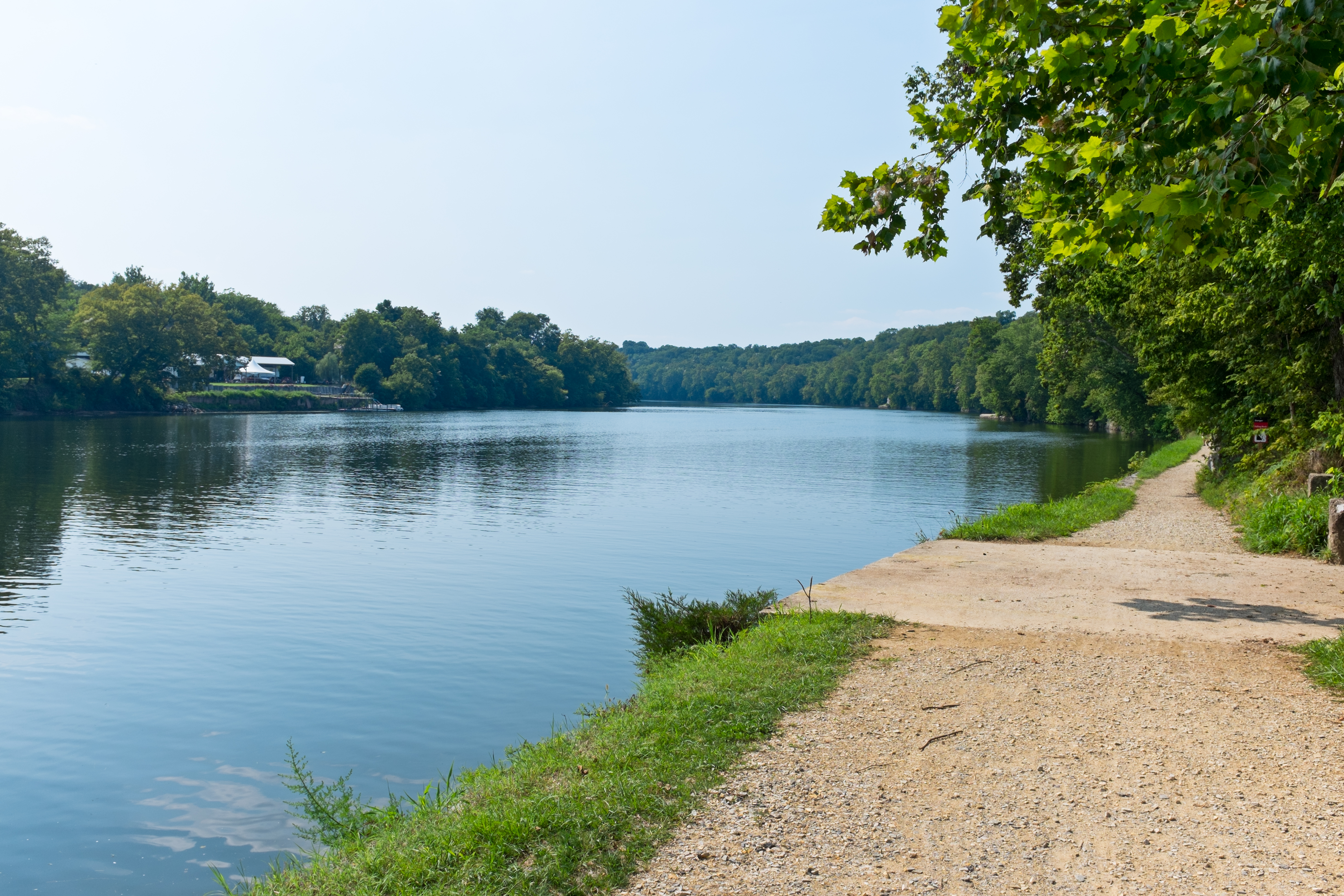
A view of Big Slackwater, made by Dam No. 4. Towpath of the C & O Canal continues on the right

The dam was originally built for the Chesapeake and Ohio Canal. On June 7, 1832, the contract was awarded to Joseph Hollman, and the work was completed in June 1835, at a cost of $50.803.15 To avoid construction costs, the canal entered the slackwater above the dam, and continued in the slackwater for about 3 miles. This area was dubbed "Big Slackwater" by the canallers.

== See also ==
- Power Plant and Dam No. 5
