= Seneca Dam =

- Location of the proposed Seneca Dam
- Country: United States
- Coordinates: 39°03′27.65″N 77°19′05.054″W
- Status: Unbuilt
- Construction cost: $101,789,000 (1963)
- Owner: U.S. Army Corps of Engineers

Dam and spillways
- Type of dam: Concrete gravity
- Impounds: Potomac River
- Height: 87 ft (27 m)
- Length: 2,880 feet (880 m)
- Width (crest): 28 feet (8.5 m)
- Spillways: 27
- Spillway type: Gated overflow at dam crest

Reservoir
- Total capacity: 1,193,000 acre-feet (1.472 km^{3})
- Surface area: 24,000 acres (9,700 ha)
- Normal elevation: 226 ft (69 m)

Seneca Dam was the last in a series of dams proposed on the Potomac River in the area of the Great Falls of the Potomac. Apart from small-scale dams intended to divert water for municipal use in the District of Columbia and into the Chesapeake and Ohio Canal, no version of any scheme was ever built. In most cases the proposed reservoir would have extended upriver to Harpers Ferry, West Virginia. The project was part of a program of as many as sixteen major dams in the Potomac watershed, most of which were never built.

The earliest proposals for exploitation of hydropower on the Potomac were made in the 1880s. By the 1920s the U.S. Army Corps of Engineers reviewed the possibilities for hydroelectric power.

After a new study mandated by Congress in 1936-37, the Corps of Engineers in 1938 proposed a dam for flood control, power generation and water quality improvement, to be located above Great Falls at Riverbend. The scheme was revived following World War II. Opposition to the flooding of the entire river to Cumberland by a chain of dams, and to the inundation of the Chesapeake and Ohio Canal doomed the Riverbend proposal. However, in 1963 the Corps proposed a new plan to improve water quality on the Potomac, which moved water storage off the main stem of the Potomac to its upper tributaries and scaled the Riverbend dam back to a lower dam at Blockhouse Point, near the mouth of Little Seneca Creek, to be called Seneca Dam. This proposal was debated through the 1960s until it was finally abandoned in 1969.

== Great Falls dam proposals ==
Beginning in the 1880s a series of proposals were made to use the Potomac River's hydropower potential, which arises from the steep drop of the river at Great Falls as it crosses the Atlantic Seaboard fall line, dropping to sea level over about 10 miles (16 km). Frequent flooding and a desire to secure a reliable water supply for Washington, D.C. increased the attractiveness of a major dam on the Potomac.

A detailed plan for a major dam on the Potomac at Great Falls was first advanced by the Corps of Engineers in a 1921 report, which proposed a concrete gravity dam which would include a hydroelectric powerplant. Reservoir capacity was projected at 300,000 acre-feet (0.37 km^{3}) for a 24,000-acre (9,700 ha) reservoir with a reservoir at 215 feet above sea level. Power generation capacity was planned at 105 MW and total cost was projected at $18,616,000 in 1921.

=== Potomac Basin development ===
By direction of Congress in 1936 and 1937 the Army Corps of Engineers, which manages Washington D.C.'s water supply system, examined possibilities for flood control along the Potomac. The Corps returned with an ambitious agenda for 14 dams on the main stem of the Potomac, its branches and its major tributaries. Beginning at tidewater, a dam at Chain Bridge would extend to Bear Island, where another dam would back a reservoir up to Great Falls. Just above Great Falls the Riverbend Dam would create a reservoir up to Sandy Hook, just below Harpers Ferry. Dams at Sandy Hook, Rocky Marsh Run, Pinesburg and Little Orleans would convert the main stem of the river to a series of slackwater reservoirs. More dams on the North and South Forks of the Potomac, the North River and the Shenandoah River would complete the scheme. The Corps suggested that the discharge from the Riverbend Dam could enhance flow over Great Falls during daylight hours. Locks were to be provided to allow small craft to reach Harpers Ferry. The cost of this program was estimated at $235 million in 1945.

The Corps plan, which would have inundated nearly all of the defunct Chesapeake and Ohio Canal was opposed by the National Park Service, which had acquired the canal property in 1938. A 1954 hearing at the Department of the Interior was attended by more than 1000 people, only three of whom spoke in favor of the Corps plan. In the meantime the Park Service had proposed its own plan for a parkway on the canal right-of-way from Cumberland to Washington. Opposition to this plan gained force during the 1950s and culminated in a 1954 letter to the Washington Post by U.S. Supreme Court Justice William O. Douglas blasting the plan and urging the canal's preservation as a wild park, and challenging Post editors to walk the 185-mile (298 km) length of the canal towpath. Joined by conservation leaders and supported by the Park Service, the hike was accomplished in seven days and brought the preservationist cause extensive publicity.

In 1958 the Corps again was directed by Congress to study dams, this time to improve water quality in addition to flood control. Tension between legislation for park use and water management use increased, until President Dwight D. Eisenhower proclaimed Chesapeake and Ohio Canal National Monument under the authority of the Antiquities Act on January 18, 1961. The proclamation earned the enmity of House Interior and Insular Affairs Committee Chairman Wayne Aspinall. Later in 1961 a park authorization bill was proposed with Aspinall's support that would allow dam construction on the Potomac. In May 1962 the Corps proposed a new scheme for 16 dams on the Potomac and its tributaries. This version scrapped most of the mainstem dams in favor of more tributary dams, and moved the Riverbend Dam to a site at Seneca, 4.5 miles (7.2 km) upstream. The Seneca Dam was to be lower than Riverbend. Douglas immediately attacked the proposal, as did Maryland Representative Charles Mathias. A task force review in 1966 opposed the Seneca Dam. In 1968 draft legislation proposed the Potomac National River, eliminating the possibility of a Seneca Dam in favor of more tributary dams. However, this proposal was opposed by landowners and other interests in the areas earmarked for dams on the Monocacy, Cacapon and upper Potomac rivers. In 1968 Congress converted the national monument into Chesapeake and Ohio Canal National Historical Park, effectively precluding dam construction anywhere along the length of the park. By 1969 the Seneca Dam proposal had been publicly abandoned by the Corps of Engineers.

Water quality and supply concerns that had previously been cited as reasons for dam building were addressed by new Federal requirements for stringent sewage treatment, which greatly improved water quality on the lower Potomac, eliminating the need to dilute effluent in reservoirs. Mine waste discharge was also regulated, with dilution provided by the eventual construction of Jennings Randolph Lake on the North Branch of the Potomac by the Corps of Engineers.

== Riverbend Dam ==
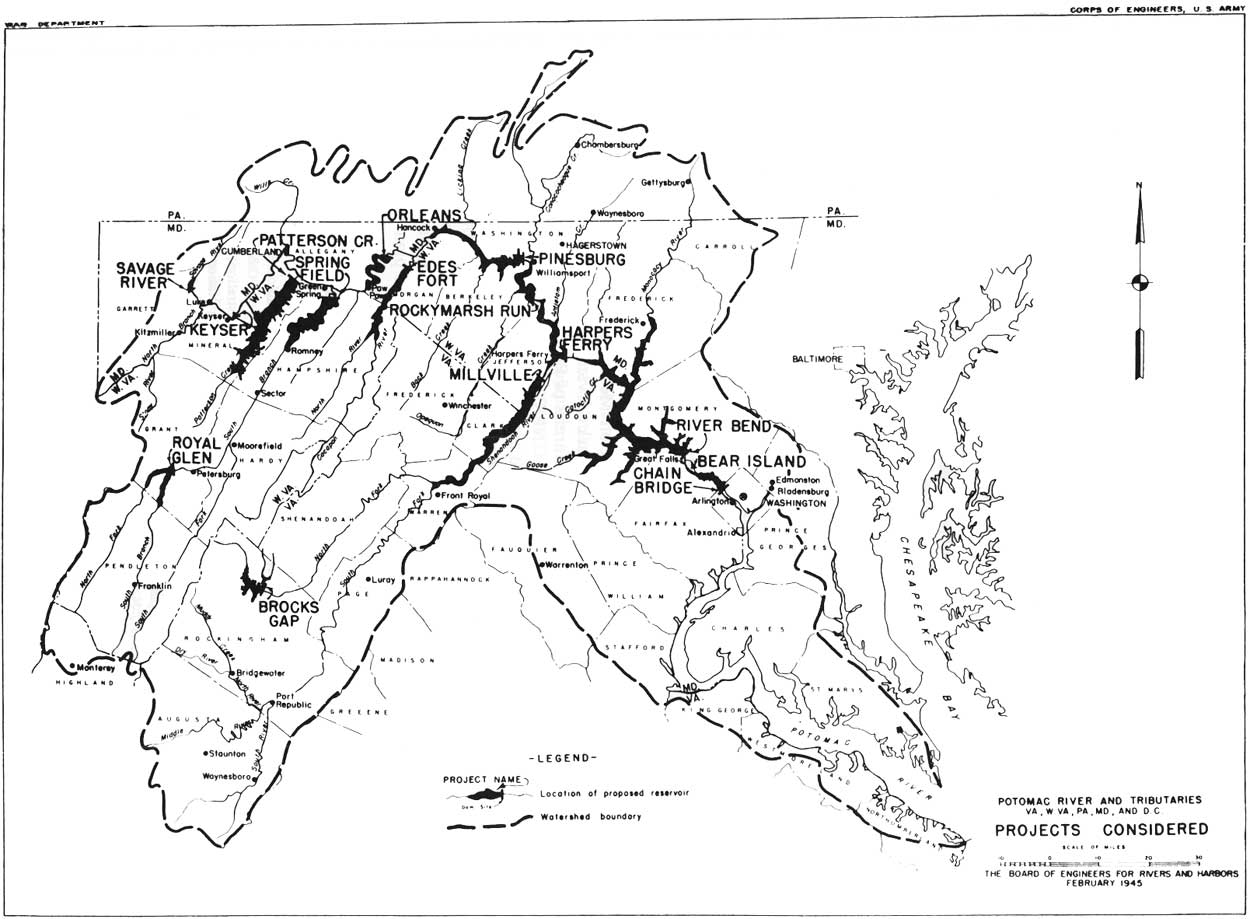
Dams proposed in the Potomac River basin in 1945

The Riverbend Dam was to be a 119-foot (36 m) dam at the westward bend of the Potomac just above Great Falls. Its reservoir was to extend nearly to Harpers Ferry, with branches extending up the Monocacy River past Frederick and major branches on streams in Loudoun County, Virginia. The dam was to incorporate small locks to allow pleasure boats to reach Harpers Ferry. After intense public opposition the Riverbend project was shelved in favor of less ambitious proposals

== Seneca Dam ==
The final proposal for a lower Potomac dam was Seneca Dam. The concept developed in the 1950s and was proposed by the Corps of Engineers in its final form in the 1963 Potomac River Basin Report. Answering objections to the visual intrusion of the Riverbend Dam at Great Falls, Seneca Dam was placed at Blockhouse Point, about 1.6 miles (2.6 km) downstream from the mouth of Seneca Creek, about 4.5 miles (7.2 km) upstream from the Riverbend site and just downstream from the Chesapeake and Ohio Canal's Dam Number 2. No immediate hydroelectric development was planned, the dam was meant to provide a water source, to control floods, and to provide recreation. The Corps of Engineers assumed that water quality would continue to decline under the effects of upstream sewage discharge, especially during periods of low river flow, and opined that unless sewage was diverted by pipeline to the Chesapeake Bay, a dam would be necessary to dilute the effluent to an acceptable level. However, the Corps projected that the Seneca reservoir would not be able to assure sufficient water flow and quality without support from upstream dams on tributaries.

The dam was planned as a straight-crested concrete gravity dam with a central overflow spillway regulated by 27 gates. Provision for future power generation was to be included in the south abutment, with water supply provisions on either end of the dam. No lock was to be provided for small craft. For flood control the project was designed to pass 150,000 cu ft/s (4,200 m^{3}/s) of a 400,000 cu ft/s (11,000 m^{3}/s) flood to minimize damage downstream. Drawdown from May to September was expected to be about 5 feet (1.5 m), with another 7 feet (2.1 m) for the rest of the year. The pool would have varied from 38,700 acres (15,700 ha) at maximum flood pool to 24,000 acres (9,700 ha) at full conservation pool, and 9,100 acres (3,700 ha) at minimum pool. Construction was expected to take six years. The reservoir was planned to store 550,000 acre-feet (0.68 km^{3}), of which 50,000 acre-feet (0.062 km^{3}) were allocated for sedimentation. An additional 643,000 acre-feet (0.793 km^{3}) were available for flood storage.

The reservoir was projected to cost more than $100 million in 1962 dollars. The project was opposed by Maryland and Virginia, as well as by conservation organizations and fell out of favor with the Corps of Engineers in 1969. As with the Riverbend proposal, the reservoir was to spread along tributary creeks and reservoirs, in some cases considerable distances. On the Virginia side, Sugarland Run would have been flooded to Herndon, Broad Run to Sterling, Goose Creek to Evergreen Mill and Catoctin Creek to Taylorstown. On the Maryland side, Seneca Creek would have been flooded past Dawsonville, and the Monocacy River would have been flooded past Frederick to Ceresville. The main river pool would have extended to Sandy Hook, Maryland. Maps of the reservoir show that portions of Point of Rocks and Buckeystown, Maryland would have been flooded by the full flood pool, and most or all of Lilypons and Seneca in Maryland, Limestone School and Fairview in Virginia and White's Ferry in Maryland and Virginia. The lower portion of the Ball's Bluff battlefield would have been submerged, as well as the Monocacy Aqueduct.

Roads and railroads were expected to be flooded by the reservoir and would have had to be replaced. The 1963 report described the relocations as "extensive." Road relocations were budgeted at $8,500,000 and railroads at $10,040,000. About 21,000 acres (8,500 ha) of wildlife habitat was expected to be inundated, including the McKee-Beshers and Dierssen wildlife management areas. 13,120 acres (5,310 ha) of replacement habitat was expected to be required to mitigate habitat loss. The project was judged to have little effect on agriculture and forestry. 460 families were expected to be displaced.

== See also ==
- Tocks Island Dam controversy
