= 2009 Peanut Corporation of America recall =

Food recall

In late 2008 and early 2009, nine people died and at least 714 people fell ill due to food poisoning from eating products containing contaminated peanuts supplied by the Peanut Corporation of America (PCA). The real numbers were believed to be much higher, since for every reported case of salmonellosis, on average, another 30 or so cases went unreported, according to the Centers for Disease Control and Prevention (CDC). A combination of epidemiological analysis and laboratory testing by state officials in Minnesota and Connecticut, the Food and Drug Administration (FDA) and the CDC confirmed that the sources of the outbreak of illnesses caused by Salmonella typhimurium were peanut butter, peanut paste, and peanut meal produced by the PCA at its Blakely, Georgia, processing plant.

On February 7, 2009, Oregon officials confirmed the first case of salmonellosis in a dog that had eaten biscuits contaminated with the PCA-produced peanut products.

In January 2009, the company issued a statement categorically denying the allegations; in that same month, it shut down production and laid off 50 employees at the Blakely plant. In September 2015, the company owner and his brother received prison sentences along with other executives.

== Background ==
=== Aflatoxin suits ===
PCA was sued in 1990 by the American Candy Company after the FDA discovered that PCA's peanut butter exceeded the FDA tolerance level for aflatoxin, a mold-derived toxin. American Candy had turned the peanut butter into 8,000 cases of "kisses" for Wal-Mart. Another lawsuit was brought by Zachary Confections Inc. of Frankfort, Indiana, in 1991, after a 40,020-pound shipment of nuts from PCA was also found to have an unacceptably high level of aflatoxin.

=== Nestlé inspection ===
In January 2006, Nestlé completed an onsite audit of PCA's Plainview, Texas plant, and gave it a "Does Not Meet Standards" score on nearly all 40 inspection areas. Kenneth Kendrick, who had worked as an assistant plant manager for several months in 2006 at the Plainview plant left, because according to him, he "knew it was a train wreck and something unethical and bad was about to happen". In 2009, he was interviewed by The New York Times and ABC News, where he detailed the unsanitary conditions at the plant. Because of his whistleblowing, the plant was investigated by federal and state officials as another source of the outbreak, and was found to be shipping peanut products between PCA facilities in different states, which contradicted what Parnell had previously told authorities investigating the outbreak.

=== FDA oversight before 2008 ===
In 2001, FDA inspectors also found that products from the Blakely plant were potentially exposed to insecticides, according to a report obtained by the Associated Press.

According to Virginia state inspection records, the PCA blanching operations in Suffolk, Virginia, had some of the same food safety problems that would be found in the company's Georgia plant (see below). Inspection in 2008 found mold on "totes" holding peanuts, counted 43 mouse droppings on the floor, and saw a live bird walking and flying inside the warehouse.

== Recall ==
This contamination event triggered the most extensive food recall ever in U.S. history. As of April 22, 2009, it involved at least 361 companies and 3,913 different products manufactured using PCA ingredients. The recall included everything produced at the Blakely plant since January 1, 2007, as well as everything ever produced at the Plainview, Texas, plant. Products supplied for some school lunches were pulled, and the Federal Emergency Management Agency (FEMA) even recalled emergency meals sent after a massive ice storm. (Since the storm left many without power, the United States Postal Service went door-to-door in Kentucky to warn residents and hand out 600,000 flyers from FEMA.) Food banks nationwide had to discard thousands of pounds of food in time of high demand from millions of U.S. families in need.

The recall did not involve major-brand peanut butters, since PCA primarily served only low-budget and institutional providers, but many consumers reacted by avoiding peanut products altogether, driving down the sales of all brands of peanut butter by nearly 25%. This caused great harm to the industry and farmers, already suffering from low prices due to the 2008 bumper crop and the deepening economic crisis. Losses to the U.S. peanut industry because of this outbreak were estimated to be $1 billion.

== 2009 investigations ==
=== Georgia ===
==== Journalistic ====
Following initial reporting of the outbreak's source, reporters and investigators began taking a careful look at the sites run by PCA. The Washington Post reported on February 14, 2009, the view of David Brooks, a buyer for a snack company that had visited PCA facilities in the mid-1980s (when PCA was under Hugh Parnell's control), that "everybody in the peanut industry" in the states involved (Georgia, Virginia, and Texas) knew of the serious sanitation issues associated with PCA; Brooks went on to state that PCA was "a time bomb waiting to go off".

Former employees interviewed by the Chicago Tribune stated that conditions in the plant were "filthy and nasty", and that they would never eat the peanut butter or allow their children to eat it. One employee remembered seeing a family of baby mice in a tote of peanuts, and others recalled having to step over standing water inside the building after heavy rain. Another former employee told CBS News that he saw a rat dry-roasting in a peanut area. Another told ABC News that workers had no idea the company had positive Salmonella tests because "that information is not for the average employee to see".

==== Food and Drug Administration ====
Food and Drug Administration (FDA) inspectors reported, following a two-week inspection of the Blakely, Georgia, plant in January 2009, that the company had information that its peanut-butter products were tainted with Salmonella, but shipped them anyway after "retesting" them. This occurred at least 12 times between 2007 and 2008. FDA inspectors also found mold growing on the plant's ceiling and walls, foot-long gaps in its roof, dead insects near peanuts, and holes in the plant big enough for rodents to enter. Inspectors found that the company also did not clean its equipment after finding contamination, and did not properly segregate raw and finished products. In 2007, the company shipped chopped peanuts on two occasions even after Salmonella was confirmed by private lab tests. The company had previously refused to divulge production test records until federal officials invoked the food safety provisions of the Public Health Security and Bioterrorism Preparedness Response Act. As a result of this refusal and the incident in general, the Georgia State Senate passed a bill requiring peanut product manufacturers to report any contamination within 24 hours, failing which felony charges would result.

On February 6, 2009, the FDA reported that the company shipped tainted products under three conditions: (1) without retesting, (2) before the retest results came back from an outside company, and (3) after a second test showed no bacterial contamination. In all three cases, the initial positive result means that the product should have been destroyed.

Documents released February 11 by the U.S. House Energy and Commerce Committee showed that the company shipped products to customers even before receiving results of Salmonella tests, and selectively chose laboratories to mask contamination.

=== Texas ===
The company had operated a plant in Gorman, where the company originally started in 1977. David Brooks, the snack food company buyer interviewed by The Washington Post after the Salmonella outbreak, said that he inspected this plant three times on behalf of his company in the mid-1980s to determine whether to buy peanuts from PCA. The plant failed his private inspection each time for what he called "just filthy" conditions, including dusty beams, leaky roofs, and birds flying through the building. The Gorman operations transferred to Plainview when Hale County officials issued $2 million in tax-free revenue bonds to help the company convert a long vacant Jimmy Dean sausage factory into a peanut plant. Local officials, including a county health inspector, toured the new plant and approved its opening, although the state said it never knew the plant existed. The plant was located along a major highway, across from a large Wal-Mart distribution center; it had four highly visible signs in the front and a billboard bearing a picture of a peanut. A state inspector who drove by the plant "a few times" on his way to other inspections never stopped because it was not on his list. State officials said the company was solely to blame for failing to obtain the food manufacturer's license when the Plainview plant opened.

The company's plant in Plainview opened in March 2005 and employed 30 people, but was never licensed in that state as a food manufacturing facility; the state had not done any inspections until the problems with the Georgia plant became news. The Texas plant blanched, dry- and oil-roasted, and chopped peanuts, then shipped them to food companies across the country. The plant had been certified for organic production in November 2005, based on what state officials later called incomplete information obtained by an inspector with the Texas Department of Agriculture. However, the company failed to apply for a Texas health certificate, which would have triggered a visit by state inspectors. State health officials were not aware the plant existed until the company released a list of its plants around the country.

The Texas inspection in January 2009 found some unsanitary conditions, such as unclean sections of a peanut-roasting line. It also reported that several internal company laboratory tests dating back to November had found no Salmonella or other contaminants. However, on February 10, 2009, company officials announced that the Texas plant had been shut down, after samples taken on February 4 tested positive for Salmonella. Former workers at the Texas plant interviewed by The New York Times said that the facility was "disgusting". It said the plant shared many of the problems found in the plant in Georgia, including a badly leaking roof and rodent infestation. A former plant manager told Good Morning America that he had repeatedly complained to the company owner, Stewart Parnell, about unsanitary conditions, including "water leaking off a roof and bird feces washing in", but Parnell would not authorise money for necessary repairs.

On February 12, 2009, Texan health officials ordered an unprecedented recall of all products ever shipped from the Texas plant since it opened in 2005, after discovering that the plant's air-handling system was drawing in debris from a crawl space containing "dead rodents, rodent excrement and bird feathers" into production areas. State health officials said they issued the sweeping recall because they did not know how long the unsanitary conditions had existed at the plant.

=== Virginia ===
The PCA's peanut blanching operation in Suffolk, Virginia, employed 13 workers and was shut down the day PCA filed for bankruptcy.

== Criminal proceedings ==
=== Georgia investigation ===
Tommy Irvin, commissioner of the Georgia Department of Agriculture (GDA), requested criminal investigation of the Georgia Bureau of Investigation (GBI) as the organization responsible for inspections contracted by the FDA. GDA and GBI officials had said they would consider pursuing manslaughter charges if federal authorities did not take up the case. On January 30, 2009, federal health officials announced that a criminal investigation had been launched by the U.S. Justice Department for possible prosecution under provisions of the 1938 Federal Food, Drug, and Cosmetic Act. On February 4, Georgia officials said they would not prosecute the company, because the two state laws under consideration (reckless conduct and adulteration of food) were only misdemeanors and would only allow for minor penalties. Vernon Keenan, director of the Georgia Bureau of Investigation, said: "Any potential prosecution is most appropriately handled at the federal level".

=== Federal prosecution ===
On February 9, 2009, the Federal Bureau of Investigation (FBI) announced that it had joined with the FDA's Office of Criminal Investigations (FDA-OCI) as part of a criminal investigation of the company. Search warrants were executed on the Blakely plant, as well as PCA's corporate headquarters in Lynchburg. Following a raid by its agents, the Federal Agents sealed off the Blakely plant. On February 21, 2013, four former officials of the company were named in a 75-count indictment on charges related to Salmonella-tainted peanuts and peanut products. The former processing plant manager for Peanut Corporation, Samuel Lightsey, reached a plea agreement on May 8, 2014. Lightsey was then available to the government as a witness at the trial, scheduled to begin in July 2014.

=== Convictions ===
Parnell and his brother were convicted in September 2014 of 71 criminal counts, including conspiracy, fraud and other federal charges. In July 2015, Federal prosecutors recommended a sentence of life imprisonment for Stewart Parnell. Both Daniel Kilgore and Samuel Lightsey (both former plant managers at PCA) pleaded guilty on their related charges and became government witnesses in the case, providing testimony during the 2014 trial, for consideration of limited sentencing.

=== Sentencing ===
In July 2015, federal authorities recommended a sentence of life imprisonment for Parnell. He faced a statutory maximum of 804 years in prison. On September 21, 2015, Parnell was sentenced to 28 years in prison, the longest punishment ever handed out to a producer in a U.S. foodborne illness case. His brother, Michael Parnell, was sentenced to 20 years in prison, and the plant's former quality assurance manager Mary Wilkerson was sentenced to five years. On October 1, 2015, Samuel Lightsey was sentenced to three years in prison and Daniel Kilgore was sentenced to six years in prison. Both men had agreed to cooperate with the government in exchange for leniency.

U.S. District Judge W. Louis Sands stated during sentencing, "We place faith that no one would intentionally ship products to market that are contaminated ... Consumers are at the mercy of food producers for the safety of the products. These acts [of the convicted PCA executives] were driven by profit and the protection of profit ... thus greed." Sands told Stewart Parnell that he had "taken risks for years", that they were "eventually discovered and traced back" to his corporation, and that, unfortunately, "thousands of people suffered and nine died" from Parnell's knowing disregard for public health and safety.

==== Imprisonments ====
Stewart Parnell is currently imprisoned in the Federal Correctional Institution, Hazelton, Michael Parnell is imprisoned in the Federal Correctional Institution, Fort Dix, Daniel Kilgore served his sentence in the United States Penitentiary, Atlanta until he was released on April 13, 2020, Mary Wilkerson served her sentence in the Federal Correctional Institution, Tallahassee until she was released on February 9, 2020, and Samuel Lightsey served his sentence in the Federal Correctional Institution, Forrest City until he was released on September 29, 2017.

== Bankruptcy ==
On February 13, 2009, less than 24 hours after the Texas recall, Peanut Corporation of America announced it was permanently halting operations and filing for Chapter 7 bankruptcy. Bankruptcy lawyer Andrew Goldstein said that the company had considered filing for Chapter 11, but decided to liquidate because all of its plants had been shut down and there was no way it could carry on business. Consumers Union criticised the move, saying that the bankruptcy filing would shield the company from liability suits, although in reality, the bankruptcy filing merely delays any claims against the company.

== Other federal action ==
Parnell served on the U.S. Department of Agriculture's Peanut Standards Board, which sets quality and handling standards for peanuts. He was first appointed by Agriculture Secretary Mike Johanns to the position in 2005, and was reappointed for another term that would have expired in 2011, but on February 5, 2009, the USDA announced that the new Agriculture Secretary Tom Vilsack had removed Parnell from the board.

On February 5, 2009, the U.S. Department of Agriculture (USDA) announced that Peanut Corporation of America and a subsidiary, Tidewater Blanching LLC, were banned from all federal government contracts and subcontracts for one year, saying the company: "lacks business integrity and business honesty, which seriously and directly hinders its ability to do business with the federal government".
