= Peanut Corporation of America =

Defunct peanut processing company

- Type: Private
- Industry: Peanut processing
- Founded: 1977
- Defunct: February 13, 2009
- Fate: Chapter 7 bankruptcy
- Headquarters: Lynchburg, Virginia, United States
- Key people: Hugh Parnell (founder); Stewart Parnell (President & CEO; convicted and imprisoned on 71 criminal counts); David Royster (Vice President)
- Products: Peanut butter, peanut paste, peanut meal, whole and chopped peanuts
- Revenue: $25 million (2007)
- Owner: Stewart Parnell
- Number of employees: 90 (2007)
- Website: peanutcorp.com at the WayBack Machine (archived September 26, 2008)

Peanut Corporation of America (PCA) was an American peanut-processing company based in Lynchburg, Virginia. It was founded in Gorman, Texas by Hugh Parnell Sr. in 1977. By 2007, the company employed 90 employees and made revenues of $25 million in annual sales. It had been estimated to have been manufacturing roughly 2.5% of processed peanuts in the United States at that time, providing peanut and peanut butter products primarily to schools, prisons and nursing homes, to food manufacturers for use in cookies, snacks, ice cream, and dog treats, and to low-budget retail outlets such as dollar stores.

In 2009, Peanut Corporation of America was implicated in an outbreak of salmonellosis that sickened at least 714 and killed 9 people, deemed one of the most widespread foodborne illness outbreaks in United States history. The outbreak resulted in the largest food recall in the country's history at the time and, in turn, lead to the company filing for Chapter 7 bankruptcy on February 13 that year.

== History ==
Peanut Corporation of America was founded in 1977 and initially run by Hugh Parnell Sr. along with his sons Stewart, Michael and Hugh Jr. Initially starting as a $50,000-a-year peanut roasting operation, the company would eventually grow into a $30 million business before being sold sometime between 1994 and 1995, after which Hugh Parnell Sr. retired. Stewart Parnell, along with the others, remained as consultants with the new company until he repurchased the Gorman plant in 2000 via a private sale. The Gorman plant would later be closed in favor of a new plant located in Plainview, Texas due to the westward movement of the peanut industry in the state.

In February of 2001, Stewart Parnell purchased another peanut processing company based in Blakely, Georgia, Casey's Food Products, from David Royster Jr. The company, whose operations at the time consisted solely of roasting and blanching peanuts, would become Peanut Corporation of America's Blakely facility, and Parnell would triple revenue at the plant by 2004, turning its first profit in 15 years, with production regularly surpassing 2.5 million pounds of peanuts per month. Parnell would also purchase the Tidewater Blanching Corporation in Suffolk, Virginia in the same year.

=== Business practices and prior health concerns ===
Under Hugh Parnell Sr., the company operated a bare-bones front office and used minimum-wage labor, practices continued by Stewart Parnell, who ran the company from a converted garage behind his home in an upscale suburb outside of Lynchburg, Virginia. Moreover, investigations stemming from the 2009 salmonellosis outbreak revealed that some processing by the company, such as the manufacturing of peanut butter, was done without the knowledge and oversight of the Food and Drug Administration, and other food handling and processing areas had gone long periods without federal inspection.

Concerns about food safety and sanitation at the company had been raised since at least the mid-1980s. In 1990, the FDA found Peanut Corporation of America distributing peanuts with high levels of aflatoxins, which are produced by mold that grows in nuts and seeds, including peanuts. The company had additionally been sued by the American Candy Company in 1990 and Zachary Confections in 1991 for the presence of aflatoxin levels that exceeded the acceptable level set by the FDA. A former manager of the company's plant in Plainview attempted to inform Stuart Parnell of the unsanitary conditions at the location in 2006, but Parnell had refused to provide funds to address the problems at the plant, citing financial issues.

Prior to the outbreak and despite more than 12 tests between 2007 and 2008 showing evidence of Salmonella contamination in company products, Stuart Parnell wrote an email to company employees on January 12, 2009 claiming that no such contamination had been found in the company's plants or products. Parnell ordered products that had tested positive for Salmonella to be shipped and complained that the contamination tests were "costing us huge $$$$$." In a June 2008 email exchange, Parnell complained to a worker after being notified that Salmonella had been found in more products.

== 2009 salmonellosis outbreak and closure ==
In 2009, Peanut Corporation of America was implicated as the source of a massive salmonellosis outbreak in the United States that killed 9 people and sickened at least 714 others who ate products containing peanuts contaminated with Salmonella bacteria during late 2008 and early 2009. Investigations conducted in the wake of the outbreak would show that some of the company's processing was done without FDA knowledge and oversight, and other food handling and processing areas had gone long periods without federal inspection.

This outbreak triggered the most extensive food recall in United States history up to that time, involving 46 states, more than 360 companies, and more than 3,900 different products manufactured using ingredients provided by the company, which ultimately recalled every product made from its facilities in Blakely, Georgia and Plainview, Texas since January 2007 and March 2005 respectively.

On February 13, 2009, Peanut Corporation of America ceased all manufacturing and business operations and filed for Chapter 7 bankruptcy liquidation.

In September 2015, Stewart Parnell was sentenced to 28 years in federal prison for his role in the nationwide outbreak while his brother, Michael Parnell, was sentenced to 20 years in prison.

== Legacy ==
The company and the outbreak it was implicated in were documented in a 2015 episode of the Food Republic web series Food Crimes titled "P.B. & Jail." CNBC aired an episode of American Greed covering the company and Stuart Parnell, "From Peanuts to Sick Millions", on July 3, 2017.
