= Agnes Ullmann =

French microbiologist (1927–2019)

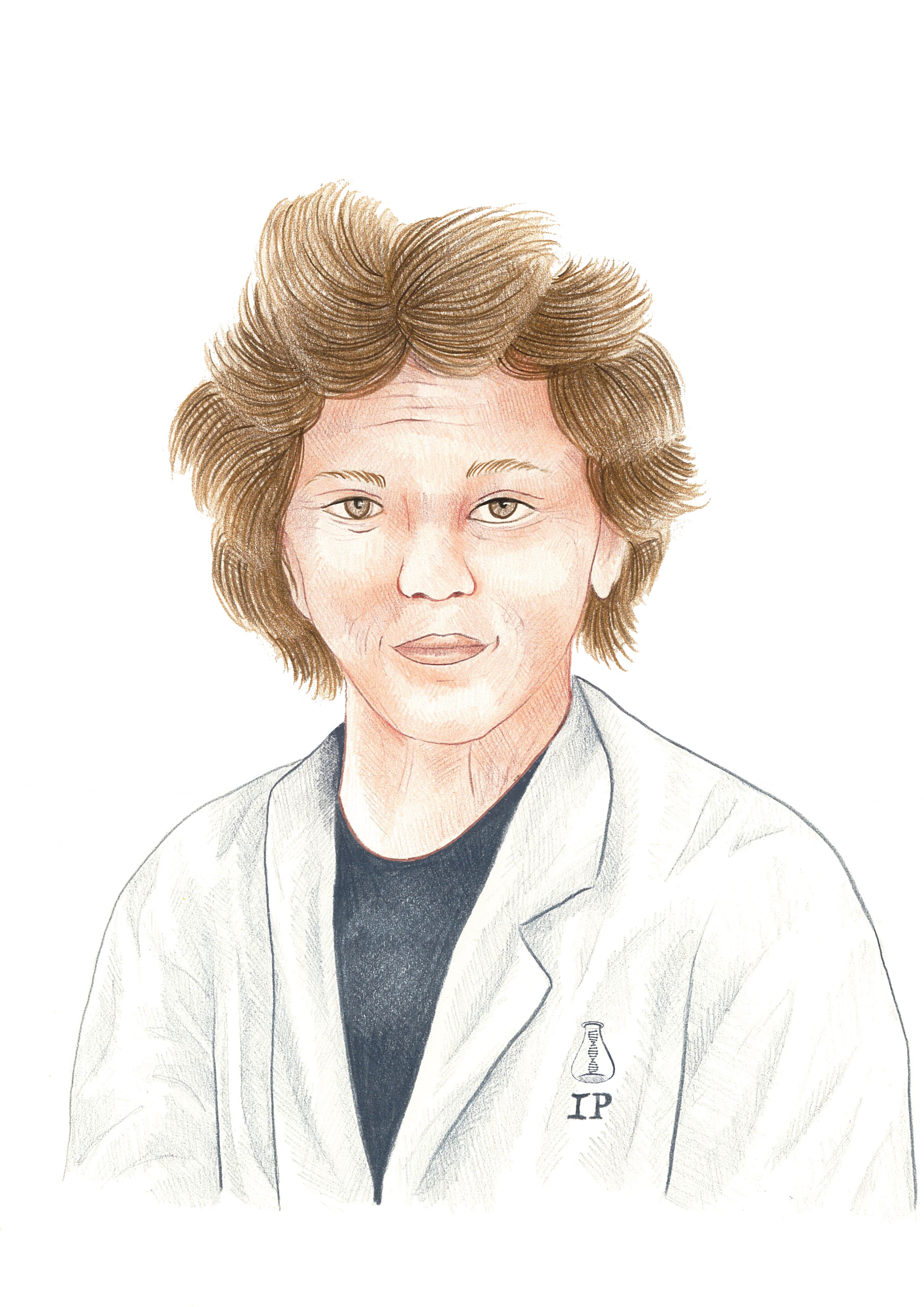
- Born: 14 April 1927; Satu Mare, Romania
- Died: 25 February 2019 (aged 91); Paris, France
- Citizenship: French
- Education: Budapest University
- Awards: Robert Koch Medal (2002)
- Scientific career
- Fields: Microbiology
- Workplaces: Institut Pasteur

Agnes Ullmann (14 April 1927 – 25 February 2019) was a Hungarian-French microbiologist who worked at the National Centre for Scientific Research (CNRS) and the Pasteur Institute. Ullmann pioneered research into the ailosteric properties of muscle-specific proteins and the role of cAMP in bacteria, She is regarded as a key figure in education at the Institute and she is known for her pioneering work in understanding the regulation of gene expression in operon systems.

== Early life and education ==
Agnes Ullmann was born on 14 April 1927 in Satu Mare, Transylvania, at the time classed as Hungary, later in Romania. Her family were Jewish Hungarians. She became interested in microbiology after her father's birthday gift of Paul de Kruif ’s book Microbe Hunters. She briefly studied at the University of Cluj, but left to earn her doctorate in microbiology from the University of Budapest.

== Career ==
After a research visit to Institut Pasteur in 1958/59 working with Jacques Monod, she moved to France in 1960 with the support of Monod, who smuggled her and her husband over the Austria/Hungary border in a Hungarian caravan. At the Institut Pasteur, she also worked with François Jacob and Elie Wollman.

Ullmann initially dealt with the effects of antibiotics at the Institut Pasteur and was able to determine, among other things, the mode of action of streptomycin (as an inhibitor of protein synthesis in bacteria). She pioneered the understanding of the promoter of lactose operon in connection with the allosteric behaviour of muscle-specific proteins. She also studied the effect of Second Messenger cAMP in the bacterial cell. In 1967 she showed that cAMP reverses catabolite repression in the bacterium E. coli. She went on to revolutionize gene cloningby developing the alpha-complementation in the enzyme beta-galactosidase. Later, she discovered another factor that boosts catabolite repression (catabolite modulator factor, or CMF).

Later in her career, while at the Cellular Regulations unit of the CNRS (1979 to 1996), Ullmann dealt with the mode of action of the whooping cough pathogen, investigating the adenylate cyclase toxin produced by the bacterium *Bordetella pertussis". She showed that the toxin increases the cAMP production itoxinn the host cell and thus disturbs their metabolism. The ability of the toxin to provide other molecules with access to the attacked host cell helped her to develop vaccines by coupling the genetically engineered whooping cough toxin with antigenic fragments that were to be immunized against.

Ullmann's responsibilities included director of research at the CNRS and head of their Biochemistry of cellular interactions unit. For a time, she was director of research applications at the Institut Paster. In addition to her scientific responsibilities, throughout her career Ullmann was always keen to help younger scientists.

Ullmann became a French citizen in 1966. She died in Paris on 25 February 2019, aged 91.

== Recognition ==
In 2002 she received the Robert Koch Medal. She was an honorary member of the Hungarian Academy of Sciences and of the European Academy of Microbiology (EAM). EAM President Philippe Sansonetti recalled all her contributions to microbiology in his "In memoriam Agnes Ullmann"

In December 2024, an inaugural ceremony was held at the Institut Pasteur to celebrate her educational contribution to the Institute. The celebrated her achievements was in connection with bestowing Agnes Ullmann in the name of the former hospital of the Institut Pasteur. Guests included Yasmine Belkaid, president of the Institut Pasteur, and Georges de Habsbourg-Lorraine, Ambassador of Hungary to France.

== Legacy ==
In 2026, Ullman was announced as one of 72 historical women in STEM whose names have been proposed to be added to the 72 men already celebrated on the Eiffel Tower. The plan was announced by the Mayor of Paris, Anne Hidalgo following the recommendations of a committee led by Isabelle Vauglin of Femmes et Sciences and Jean-François Martins, representing the operating company which runs the Eiffel Tower.

== Selected works ==
In 1978, with André Lwoff, she published a collection of essays by Jacques Monod and she published two anthologies in memory of him.

- Ullmann, Agnès; Lwoff, André, eds. (2003). Origins of molecular biology : a tribute to Jacques Monod. Washington, D.C: ASM Press. ISBN 1-55581-281-3. OCLC 53138790.
- Quagliariello, Ernesto; Bernardi, Giorgio; Ullmann, Agnes, eds. (1987). From enzyme adaptation to natural philosophy: heritage from Jacques Monod — proceedings of the Symposium "Jacques Monod and Molecular Biology, Yesterday and Today" held in Trani, Italy, 13-15 December 1986. Amsterdam; New York: Elsevier Science. ISBN 0-444-80887-6. OCLC 15631828.
- Ullmann, Agnès; Danchin, Antoine; Gasser, Francis, eds. (1986). Régulation de l'expression génétique : rôle de l'AMP cyclique (in French). Paris: Hermann. ISBN 2-7056-1416-8. OCLC 14962384.
- Ullmann, Agnes; Jacob, François; Monod, Jacques (1967). "Characterization by in vitro complementation of a peptide corresponding to an operator-proximal segment of the β-galactosidase structural gene of Escherichia coli". Journal of Molecular Biology. 24 (2). Elsevier BV: 339–343. doi:10.1016/0022-2836(67)90341-5. ISSN 0022-2836. PMID 5339877.
