= Froop =

Froop or froops may refer to:

- Froop, a German brand of fruit yogurt made by Müller (company)
- Froop, a diuretic containing furosemide
- Froops, fruit-flavored hard candies made by the American Candy Company
- Froop!, a 2002 card game
