= Theobald Smith =

American epidemiologist (1859–1934)

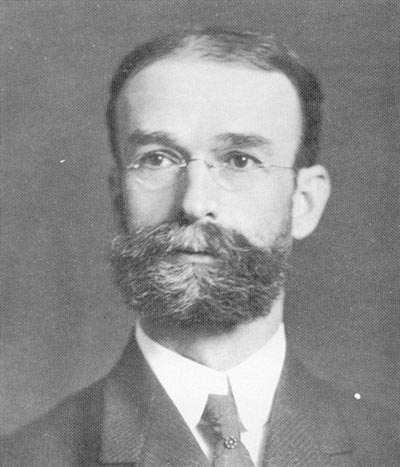
- Born: July 31, 1859; Albany, New York
- Died: December 10, 1934 (aged 75); New York City, New York
- Education: Cornell University, Albany Medical College
- Known for: Texas cattle fever, Salmonella
- Awards: Manson Medal (1932); Copley Medal (1933)
- Scientific career
- Fields: Epidemiology
- Workplaces: US Department of Agriculture, Harvard University, Rockefeller University

Theobald Smith FRS(For) HFRSE (July 31, 1859 – December 10, 1934) was a pioneering epidemiologist, bacteriologist, pathologist and professor. Smith is widely considered to be America's first internationally-significant medical research scientist.

Smith's research work included the study of babesiosis (originally known as Texas cattle fever) and the more-general epidemiology of cattle diseases caused by tick borne diseases. He also described the bacterium Salmonella enterica (formerly called Salmonella choleraesuis), a species of Salmonella, named for the Bureau of Animal Industry chief Daniel E. Salmon. Additional work in studying the phenomena of anaphylaxis led to it being referred to as the Theobald Smith phenomenon.

Smith taught at Columbian University (now George Washington University) and established the school's department of bacteriology, the first at a medical school in the United States. He later worked at Harvard University and the Rockefeller Institute.

== Education ==
Smith was born in Albany, New York, the son of Philip Smith and his wife, Theresa Kexel.

He received a Bachelor of Philosophy degree from Cornell University in 1881, followed by an MD from Albany Medical College in 1883.

After his graduation from medical school, Smith held a variety of temporary positions which might broadly be considered under the modern heading of "medical laboratory technician". After some prodding by his former professors, Smith secured a new research lab assistant position with the Veterinary Division of the US Department of Agriculture (USDA) in Washington, D.C., beginning his position there in December 1883.

== Research ==
Smith became the Inspector of the newly created Bureau of Animal Industry (BAI) in 1884. Established by Congress to combat a wide range of animal diseases—from infectious disease of swine to bovine pneumonia, Texas cattle fever to glanders—Smith worked under Daniel E. Salmon, a veterinarian and Chief of the BAI. Smith also discovered the bacterial type species which would eventually form the genus Salmonella. After two years of work studying the efficacy of bacterial vaccination in pigs, Smith erroneously believed he had found the causative agent of hog cholera.

Smith turned his attention to Texas fever, a debilitating cattle disease; this work is detailed in a chapter in Microbe Hunters, by Paul de Kruif. In 1889, he along with the veterinarian F.L. Kilbourne discovered Babesia bigemina, the tick-borne protozoan parasite responsible for Texas fever. This marked the first time that an arthropod had been definitively linked with the transmission of an infectious disease and presaged the eventual discovery of insects such as ticks and mosquitoes as important vectors in a number of diseases.

Smith also taught at Columbian University in Washington, D.C. (now George Washington University) from 1886 to 1895, establishing the school's Department of Bacteriology. In 1887, Smith began research on water sanitation in his spare time, investigating the level of fecal coliform contamination in the nearby Potomac River. Over the next five years, Smith expanded his studies to include the Hudson River and its tributaries.

While Smith's work at the BAI had been highly productive, he found the rigid federal government bureaucracy stiffing and complained about the lack of leadership from his supervisor. In 1895 Smith moved to Cambridge, Massachusetts to accept a dual appointment serving as professor of comparative pathology at Harvard University as well as directing the pathology lab at the Massachusetts State Board of Health.

Smith joined the Rockefeller Institute for Medical Research as Director of the Department of Animal Pathology in 1915 and remained there until his retirement in 1929.

He was a trustee of the Carnegie Institution from 1914 until his death in 1934.

== Law of declining virulence ==
Smith's best-known contribution was the notion, long since disproved, that there would be a “delicate equilibrium” between hosts and pathogens such that they would develop a "mutually benign relationship" over time. This was at most an educated guess and never became a scientific theory, but it became accepted as conventional wisdom and was even called the law of declining virulence. It has been disproved and replaced by the trade-off model, which explains that each host–pathogen relationship must be considered separately, that there is no general pattern that predicts how all of these relationships will develop, and that there is definitely no inevitability of decreased virulence.

== Awards and honors ==
Smith was elected to the American Academy of Arts and Sciences in 1896, the United States National Academy of Sciences in 1908, and the American Philosophical Society in 1915. In 1933, Smith was awarded the Royal Society's prestigious Copley Medal "For his original research and observation on diseases of animals and man."

== Publications ==
- Parasitism and Disease (1934)

== Other discoveries ==
- Observed differences between human and bovine tuberculosis (1895).
- Discussed the possibility of mosquitos as a malaria transmission vector (1899).
- Variation and bacterial pathogenesis (1900).
- Discovered anaphylaxis (1903), which is also sometimes referred to as "Theobald Smith's phenomenon".
- Brucellosis infections
- Used toxin/antitoxin as a vaccine for diphtheria (1909).
- In the process of investigating an epidemic of infectious abortions of cattle in 1919, Smith described the bacteria responsible for fetal membrane disease in cows now known as Campylobacter fetus.
