= Rappaport =

Rappaport may refer to:

- Rappaport (surname), Ashkenazi surname
- Rappaport family, prominent Kohanic rabbinic family
- Rappaport Center for Law and Public Policy, privately endowed public interest law center of Boston College Law School Boston, Massachusetts, USA
- Rappaport Institute for Greater Boston, research and policy center housed at the Harvard Kennedy School at Harvard University in Cambridge, Massachusetts, USA
- Rappaport Faculty of Medicine, medical school that operates in Bat Galim, Haifa, Israel
- Rappaport Vassiliadis soya peptone broth, RVS broth as an enrichment growth medium for the isolation of Salmonella species
- I'm Not Rappaport, play by Herb Gardner
