= Daniel Elmer Salmon =

American veterinarian (1850–1914)

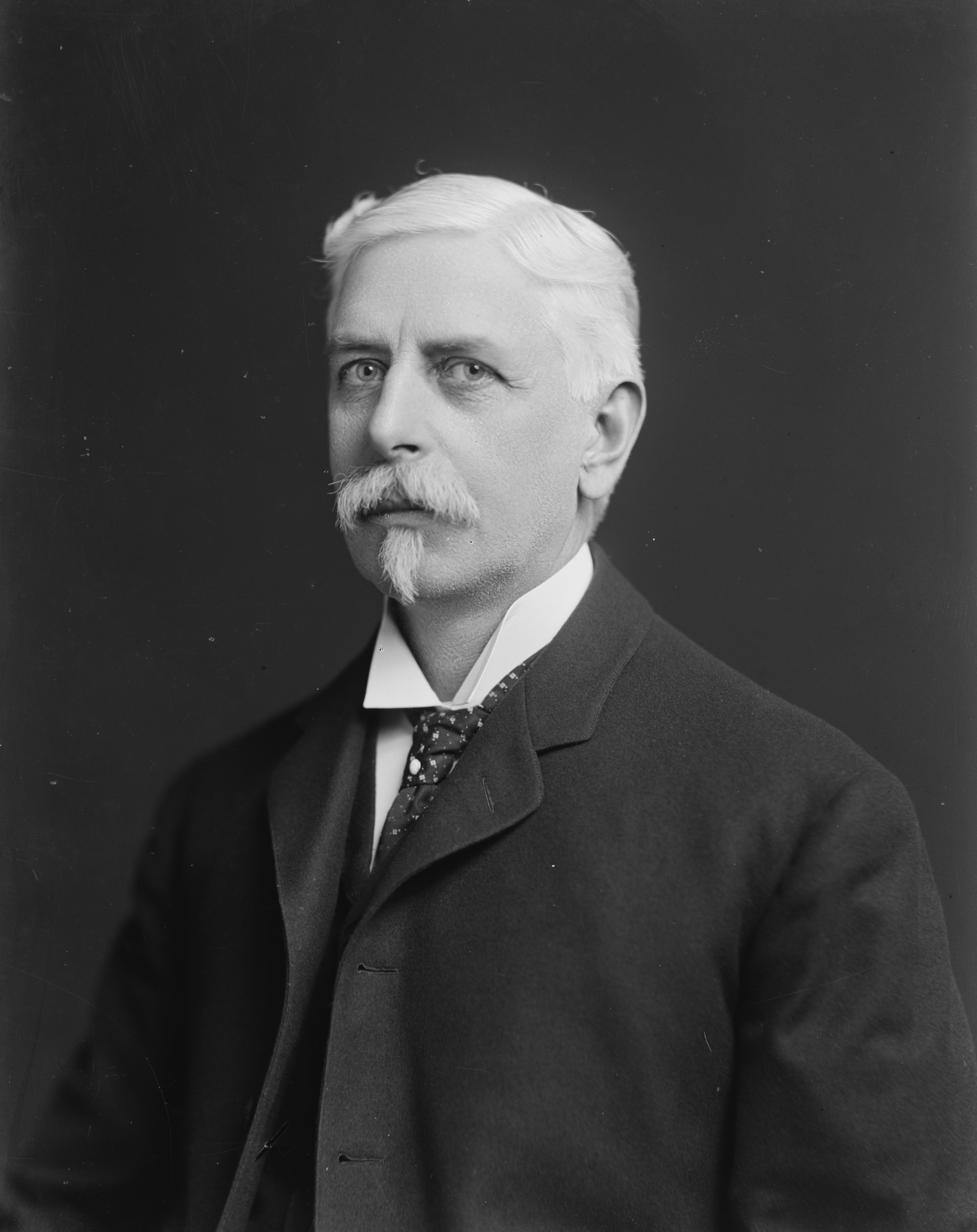
Daniel E. Salmon, c. 1903–1905

Daniel Elmer Salmon (July 23, 1850 – August 30, 1914) was an American veterinarian. He earned the first D.V.M. degree awarded in the United States, and spent his career studying animal diseases for the U.S. Department of Agriculture. The bacterial genus Salmonella, which was discovered by his assistant Theobald Smith, was named in his honor.

== Early life and education ==
Salmon was born in Mount Olive Township, New Jersey. His father, Daniel L. Salmon, died in 1851 and his mother, Eleanor Flock Salmon, died in 1859, leaving him an orphan at the age of 8. He was then raised by his second cousin, Aaron Howell Salmon, spending time working both on Aaron's farm and as a clerk at a country store. His early education was at the Mount Olive District School, Chester Institute, and Eastman Business College. He then attended Cornell University and graduated with the degree of Bachelor of Veterinary Medicine in 1872. After an additional four years of study, in veterinary health and science, he was awarded the professional degree of Doctor of Veterinary Medicine from Cornell in 1876, the first D.V.M. degree granted in the United States. Toward the end of his career at Cornell, he studied at the Alfort Veterinary School in Paris, France.

== Career ==
Salmon opened a veterinary practice in Newark, New Jersey in 1872, and subsequently moved to Asheville, North Carolina in 1875. In 1877, he gave a series of lectures at the University of Georgia on the topic of veterinary science. He worked for the State of New York, studying diseases in swine, and for the United States Department of Agriculture, studying animal diseases in the southern states. In 1883, he was asked to establish a veterinary division within the Department of Agriculture. This became the Bureau of Animal Industry, and he served as its chief from 1884 to December 1, 1905. Under his leadership, the Bureau eradicated Mycoplasma mycoides, the causative agent of contagious bovine pleuropneumonia in the United States, studied and controlled Texas fever (Babesia), put in place the federal meat inspection program, began inspecting exported livestock and the ships carrying them, began inspecting and quarantining imported livestock, and studied the effect of animal diseases on public health. In 1906 he established the veterinary department at the University of Montevideo, Uruguay, and was its head for five years. He returned to the United States in 1911 and concentrated on veterinary work in the western region of the country.

Salmonella, a genus of microorganisms, was named after him in 1900 by Joseph Leon Lignières, although the man who actually discovered and named the first strain, Salmonella choleraesuis, was Theobald Smith, Salmon's research assistant. Smith had isolated the bacterium in 1885. Since that time, more than 2,500 subtypes have been identified.

Salmon was one of the original developers of Somerset, Maryland, where he built his residence, now known as the Salmon-Stohlman House.

== Death ==
Salmon died of pneumonia on August 30, 1914, in Butte, Montana, at the age of 64. He is buried in Washington, D.C.

== Honors ==
- Honorary Associate of the Royal College of Veterinary Surgeons of Great Britain
- Fellow of the American Association for the Advancement of Science
- President and member of the executive committee, American Veterinary Medical Association
- Member of the "Washington Academy of Sciences"
