= Bismuth sulfite agar =

Medium used for growing bacteria

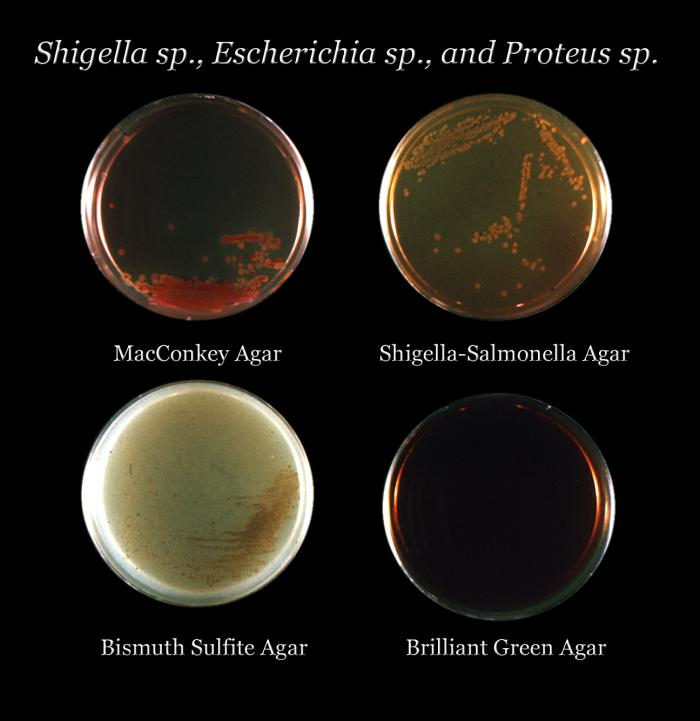
After 24 hours of growth, this image depicts four different agar media culture plates that had been inoculated with Shigella sp., Escherichia sp., and Proteus sp. bacteria, (clockwise: MacConkey, Shigella-Salmonella, Bismuth Sulfite, and Brilliant Green agars).

Bismuth sulfite agar is a type of agar media used to isolate Salmonella species. It uses glucose as a primary source of carbon. Bismuth and brilliant green (dye) both inhibit gram-positive growth. Bismuth sulfite agar tests the ability to use ferrous sulfate and convert it to hydrogen sulfide.

Bismuth sulfite agar typically contains (w/v):

1.6% bismuth sulfite Bi_{2}(SO_{3})_{3}
1.0% pancreatic digest of casein
1.0% pancreatic digest of animal tissue
1.0% beef extract
1.0% glucose
0.8% dibasic sodium phosphate
0.06% ferrous sulfate • 7 water
pH adjusted to 7.7 at 25 °C

This medium is boiled for sterility, not autoclaved.
