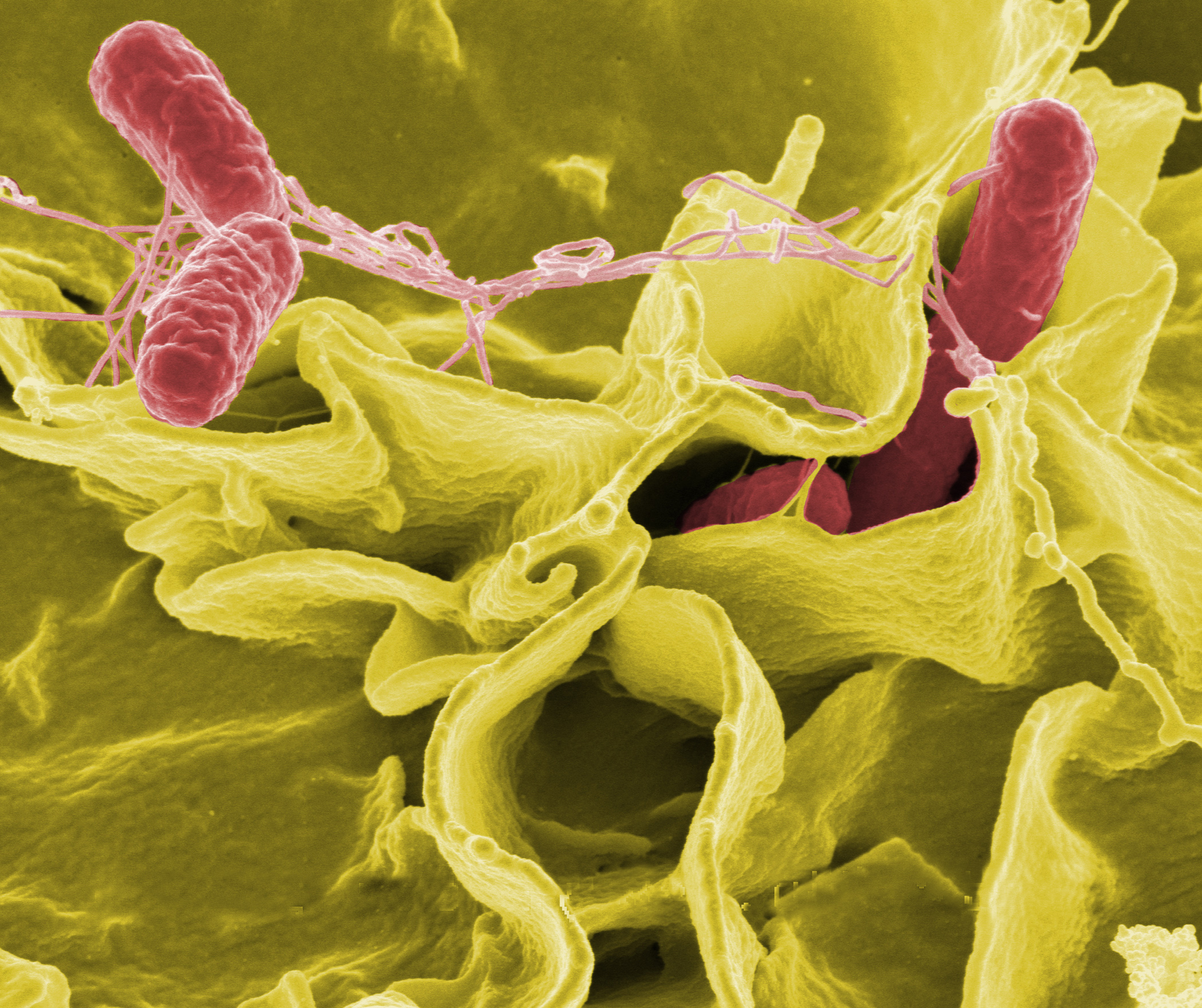
- Color-enhanced scanning electron micrograph showing Salmonella Typhimurium (red) invading cultured human cells

Scientific classification
- Domain: Bacteria
- Kingdom: Pseudomonadati
- Phylum: Pseudomonadota
- Class: Gammaproteobacteria
- Order: Enterobacterales
- Family: Enterobacteriaceae
- Genus: Salmonella; Lignières, 1900

Species and subspecies
- Salmonella bongori; Salmonella enterica; Salmonella enterica subsp. arizonae; Salmonella enterica subsp. diarizonae; Salmonella enterica subsp. enterica; Salmonella enterica subsp. houtenae; Salmonella enterica subsp. indica; Salmonella enterica subsp. salamae

= Salmonella =

Genus of bacteria

Salmonella is a genus of rod-shaped (bacillus), gram-negative bacteria of the family Enterobacteriaceae. The two known species of Salmonella are Salmonella enterica and Salmonella bongori. S. enterica is the type species and is further divided into six subspecies that include over 2,650 serotypes. Salmonella was named after Daniel Elmer Salmon (1850–1914), an American veterinary surgeon.

Salmonella species are non-spore-forming, predominantly motile enterobacteria with cell diameters between about 0.7 and 1.5 μm, lengths from 2 to 5 μm, and peritrichous flagella (all around the cell body, allowing them to move). They are chemotrophs, obtaining their energy from oxidation and reduction reactions, using organic sources. They are also facultative anaerobes, capable of generating adenosine triphosphate with oxygen ("aerobically") when it is available, or using other electron acceptors or fermentation ("anaerobically") when oxygen is not available.

Salmonella species are intracellular pathogens, of which certain serotypes cause illness such as salmonellosis. Most infections are due to the ingestion of food contaminated by feces. Typhoidal Salmonella serotypes can cause foodborne illness as well as typhoid and paratyphoid fever and can be transferred only between humans. Typhoid fever is caused by typhoidal Salmonella entering the bloodstream then spreading throughout the body, invading organs, and secreting endotoxins (the septic form). This infection can lead to life-threatening hypovolemic shock and septic shock and requires intensive care including antibiotics.

Nontyphoidal Salmonella serotypes are zoonotic and can be transferred from animals and between humans. They usually invade only the gastrointestinal tract and cause salmonellosis, the symptoms of which can be resolved without antibiotics. However, in sub-Saharan Africa, nontyphoidal Salmonella can be invasive and cause paratyphoid fever, which requires immediate antibiotic treatment.

== Taxonomy ==
The genus Salmonella is part of the family of Enterobacteriaceae. Its taxonomy has been revised and has the potential to confuse. The genus comprises two species, S. bongori and S. enterica, the latter of which is divided into six subspecies: S. e. enterica, S. e. salamae, S. e. arizonae, S. e. diarizonae, S. e. houtenae, and S. e. indica. The taxonomic group contains more than 2500 serotypes (also serovars) defined on the basis of the somatic O (lipopolysaccharide) and flagellar H antigens (the Kauffman–White classification). The full name of a serotype is given as, for example, Salmonella enterica subsp. enterica serotype Typhimurium, but can be abbreviated to Salmonella Typhimurium. Further differentiation of strains to assist clinical and epidemiological investigation may be achieved by antibiotic sensitivity testing and by other molecular biology techniques such as pulsed-field gel electrophoresis, multilocus sequence typing, and, increasingly, whole genome sequencing. Historically, salmonellae have been clinically categorized as invasive (typhoidal) or non-invasive (nontyphoidal salmonellae) based on host preference and disease manifestations in humans.

== History ==
Salmonella was first visualized in 1880 by Karl Eberth in the Peyer's patches and spleens of typhoid patients. Four years later, Georg Theodor Gaffky was able to grow the pathogen in pure culture. A year after that, medical research scientist Theobald Smith discovered what would be later known as Salmonella enterica (var. Choleraesuis). At the time, Smith was working as a research laboratory assistant in the Veterinary Division of the United States Department of Agriculture. The division was under the administration of Daniel Elmer Salmon, a veterinary pathologist. Initially, Salmonella Choleraesuis was thought to be the causative agent of hog cholera, so Salmon and Smith named it "Hog-cholera bacillus". The name Salmonella was not used until 1900, when Joseph Leon Lignières proposed that the pathogen discovered by Salmon's group be called Salmonella in his honor.

In the late 1930s, Australian bacteriologist Nancy Atkinson established a salmonella typing laboratory – one of only three in the world at the time – at the Government of South Australia's Laboratory of Pathology and Bacteriology in Adelaide (later the Institute of Medical and Veterinary Science). It was here that Atkinson described multiple new strains of salmonella, including Salmonella Adelaide, which was isolated in 1943. Atkinson published her work on salmonellas in 1957.

== Serotyping ==
Serotyping is done by mixing cells with antibodies for a particular antigen. It can give some idea about risk. A 2014 study showed that S. Reading is very common among young turkey samples, but it is not a significant contributor to human salmonellosis. Serotyping can assist in identifying the source of contamination by matching serotypes in people with serotypes in the suspected source of infection. Appropriate prophylactic treatment can be identified from the known antibiotic resistance of the serotype.

Newer methods of "serotyping" include xMAP and real-time PCR, two methods based on DNA sequences instead of antibody reactions. These methods can be potentially faster, thanks to advances in sequencing technology. These "molecular serotyping" systems actually perform genotyping of the genes that determine surface antigens.

== Detection, culture, and growth conditions ==
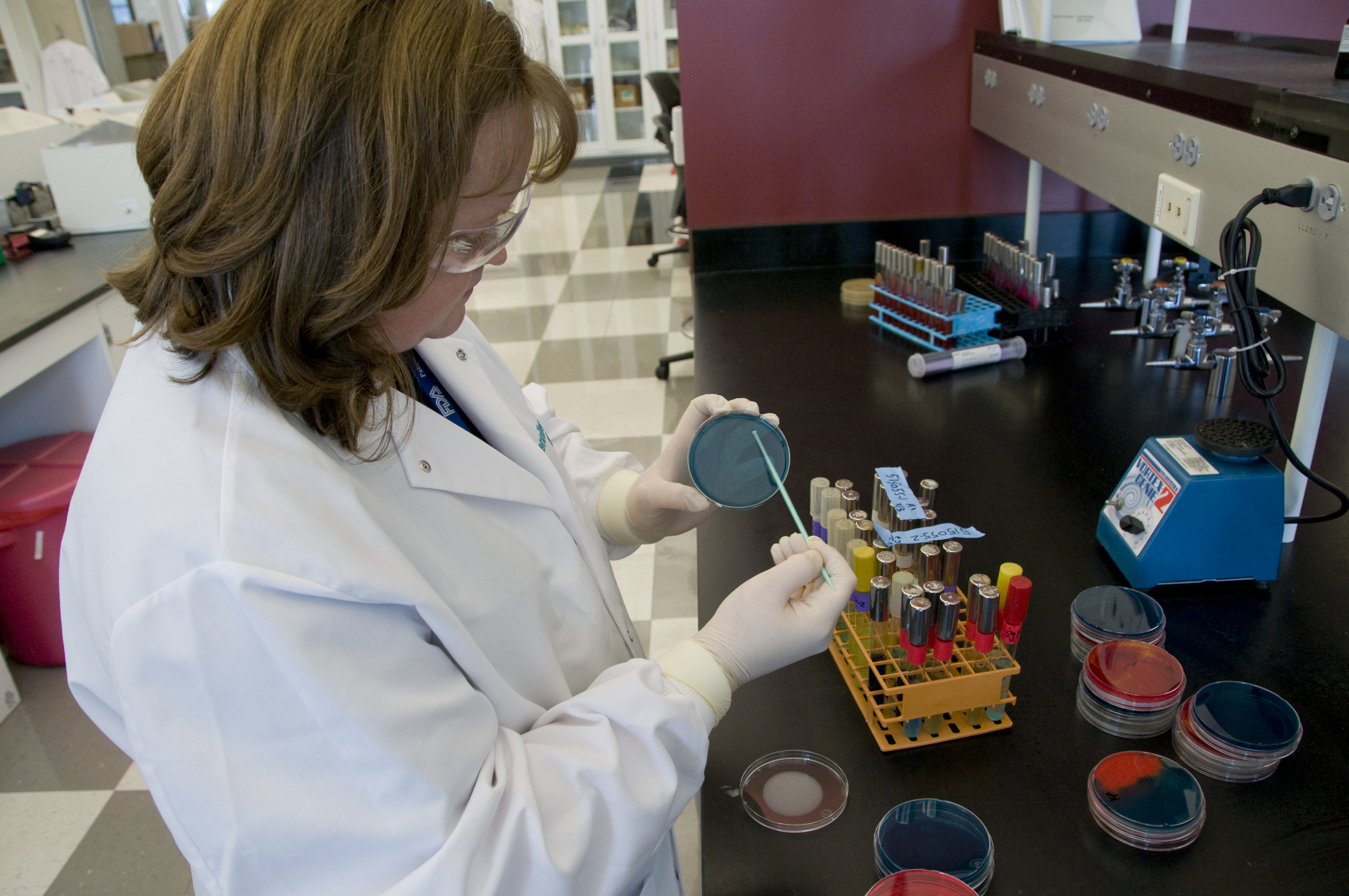
US Food and Drug Administration scientist tests for presence of Salmonella

Most subspecies of Salmonella produce hydrogen sulfide, which can readily be detected by growing them on media containing ferrous sulfate, such as is used in the triple sugar iron test. Most isolates exist in two phases, a motile phase and a non-motile phase. Cultures that are nonmotile upon primary culture may be switched to the motile phase using a Craigie tube or ditch plate. RVS broth can be used to enrich for Salmonella species for detection in a clinical sample.

Salmonella can also be detected and subtyped using multiplex or real-time polymerase chain reaction (qPCR) from extracted Salmonella DNA.

Mathematical models of Salmonella growth kinetics have been developed for chicken, pork, tomatoes, and melons. Salmonella reproduce asexually with a cell division interval of 40 minutes.

Salmonella species lead predominantly host-associated lifestyles, but the bacteria were found to be able to persist in a bathroom setting for weeks following contamination, and are frequently isolated from water sources, which act as bacterial reservoirs and may help to facilitate transmission between hosts. Salmonella is notorious for its ability to survive desiccation and can persist for years in dry environments and foods.

The bacteria are not destroyed by freezing, but UV light and heat accelerate their destruction. They perish after being heated to 55 °C (131 °F) for 90 min, or to 60 °C (140 °F) for 12 min, although if inoculated in high fat, high liquid substances like peanut butter, they gain heat resistance and can survive up to 90 °C (194 °F) for 30 min. To protect against Salmonella infection, heating food to an internal temperature of 75 °C (167 °F) is recommended.

Salmonella species can be found in the digestive tracts of humans and animals, especially reptiles. Salmonella on the skin of reptiles or amphibians can be passed to people who handle the animals. Food and water can also be contaminated with the bacteria if they come in contact with the feces of infected people or animals.

== Nomenclature ==
Initially, each Salmonella "species" was named according to clinical consideration, for example Salmonella typhi-murium (mouse-typhoid), S. cholerae-suis (pig-cholera). After host specificity was recognized not to exist for many species, new strains received species names according to the location at which the new strain was isolated. These "species" are grouped into "subgenra" using biochemical characteristics by Kauffmann, forming four groups, I through IV.

In 1987, Le Minor and Popoff used molecular findings to argue that Salmonella consisted of only one species, S. enterica, turning former "species" names into serotypes. The species contains seven DNA groups, five of which correspond to Kauffmann's (III is split in two). In 1989, Reeves et al. proposed that the DNA group V should remain its own species, resurrecting the name S. bongori. The current (by 2005) nomenclature has thus taken shape, with six recognised subspecies under S. enterica: enterica (I), salamae (II), arizonae (IIIa), diarizonae (IIIb), houtenae (IV), and indica (VI).

The serotype or serovar is a classification of Salmonella based on antigens that the organism presents. The Kauffman–White classification scheme differentiates serological varieties from each other, with the serotypes/serovars capitalized but not italicized: an example is Salmonella Typhimurium. This nomenclature can be combined with the species and subspecies, resulting in the full name Salmonella enterica subsp. enterica serovar Typhimurium. More modern approaches for typing and subtyping Salmonella include DNA-based methods such as pulsed field gel electrophoresis, multiple-loci VNTR analysis, multilocus sequence typing, and multiplex-PCR-based methods. They largely agree with the Kauffman-White results, allowing old names to be reused.

Many specialists in infectious disease are unfamiliar with the current Salmonella nomenclature, with journals needing to emphasize the correct taxonomy and orthography.

Groupings under Salmonella
Standard nomenclature	Group		Phenotype											Notes
Standard nomenclature	DNA	Kauffmann	ONPG	βGUS	aGT	Dul	Sor	Gal	Mal	Tar	Gel	KCN	ϕO1	Notes
S. enterica subsp. enterica	I	I	-	d	d	+	+	-	-	+	-	-	+	
S. enterica subsp. salamae	II	II	-	d	+	+	+	+	+	-	+	-	+	
S. enterica subsp. arizonae	IIIa	III	+	-	-	-	+	-	+	-	+	-	-	monophasic
S. enterica subsp. diarizonae	IIIb	III	+	+	+	-	+	+	+	-	+	-	+	diphasic
S. enterica subsp. houtenae	IV	IV	-	-	+	-	+	+	-	-	+	+	-	
S. enterica subsp. indica	V	N/A	d	d	+	d	+	+	-	-	+	-	+	
S. bongori	VI	N/A	+	-	+	+	-	+	-	-	-	+	+	
"S. enterica subsp. londinensis"	VII	N/A	Unknown											
N/A	VIII	N/A	Unknown											

Notes and legends:

- "d" refers to "delayed".
- The name in quotation marks is an effective name, not a validly published name.

=== Evolution ===
Two phylogenetic trees of Salmonella groups
Core genes, mixture-unaware

- bongori (V)
- - arizonae (IIIa)
  - - - houtenae (IV) B
      - - VII
        - houtenae (IV) A
    - - VIII
      - - - salamae (II) B
          - diarizonae (IIIb)
        - - salamae (II) A
          - - indica (VI)
            - - enterica (I) A
              - enterica (I) B

Treemix (mixture-aware genome)

- bongori (V)
- (1)
  - arizonae (IIIa)
  - - (3)
      - houtenae (IV) B ← (3)
      - VII ← (1)
    - - diarizonae (IIIb)
      - - VIII
        - - salamae (II) B
          - - - salamae (II) A
              - houtenae (IV) A ← (2)
            - - indica (VI)
              - - (3)
                  enterica (I) A
                - enterica (I) B

Analysis of whole Salmonella enterica genomes indicated that ancient hybridization has occurred to form some groups. As a result, standard phylogeny trees cannot fully recover the history of their evolution. Gene flux was detected from the node marked (1) to VII, from the node marked (2) to houtenae A, and from enterica B (3) to houtenae B.

GTDB RS202 reports that S. arizonae, S. diarizonae, and S. houtenae should be classified as species of their own based on the average nucleotide identity metric.

=== Non-Salmonella ===
In 2005, a third species, Salmonella subterranea, was proposed, but according to the World Health Organization, the bacterium reported does not belong in the genus Salmonella. In 2016, S. subterranea was proposed to be assigned to Atlantibacter subterranea, but LPSN rejects it as an invalid publication, as it was made outside of IJSB and IJSEM. GTDB and NCBI agree with the 2016 reassignment.

== Pathogenicity ==
Salmonella species are facultative intracellular pathogens. Salmonella can invade different cell types, including epithelial cells, M cells, macrophages, and dendritic cells. As facultative anaerobic organism, Salmonella uses oxygen to make adenosine triphosphate (ATP) in aerobic environments (i.e., when oxygen is available). However, in anaerobic environments (i.e., when oxygen is not available) Salmonella can produce ATP by anaerobic respiration — that is, by using, instead of oxygen, one of four possible electron acceptors at the end of the electron transport chain: sulfate, nitrate, sulfur, or fumarate (all of which are less efficient acceptors than oxygen) — or by fermentation.

Most infections are due to ingestion of food contaminated by animal feces, or by human feces (for example, from the hands of a food-service worker at a commercial eatery). Salmonella serotypes can be divided into two main groups—typhoidal and nontyphoidal. Typhoidal serotypes include Salmonella Typhi and Salmonella Paratyphi A, which are adapted to humans and do not occur in other animals. Nontyphoidal serotypes are more common, and usually cause self-limiting gastrointestinal disease. They can infect a range of animals, and are zoonotic, meaning they can be transferred between humans and other animals.

Salmonella pathogenicity and host interaction has been studied extensively since the 2010s. Most of the important virulent genes of Salmonella are encoded in five pathogenicity islands—the so-called Salmonella pathogenicity islands (SPIs). These are chromosomal encoded and make a significant contribution to bacterial-host interaction. More traits, like plasmids, flagella or biofilm-related proteins, can contribute in the infection. SPIs are regulated by complex and fine-tuned regulatory networks that allow the gene expression only in the presence of the right environmental stresses.

Molecular modeling and active site analysis of SdiA homolog, a putative quorum sensor for Salmonella typhimurium pathogenicity, reveals the specific binding patterns of AHL transcriptional regulators. It is also known that Salmonella plasmid virulence gene spvB enhances bacterial virulence by inhibiting autophagy.

== Typhoidal Salmonella ==
Typhoid fever is caused by Salmonella serotypes which are strictly adapted to humans or higher primates—these include Salmonella Typhi, Paratyphi A, Paratyphi B, and Paratyphi C. In the systemic form of the disease, salmonellae pass through the lymphatic system of the intestine into the blood of the patients (typhoid form) and are carried to various organs (liver, spleen, kidneys) to form secondary foci (septic form). Endotoxins first act on the vascular and nervous apparatus, resulting in increased permeability and decreased tone of the vessels, upset of thermal regulation, and vomiting and diarrhoea. In severe forms of the disease, enough liquid and electrolytes are lost to upset the water-salt metabolism, decrease the circulating blood volume and arterial pressure, and cause hypovolemic shock. Septic shock may also develop. Shock of mixed character (with signs of both hypovolemic and septic shock) is more common in severe salmonellosis. Oliguria and azotemia may develop in severe cases as a result of renal involvement due to hypoxia and toxemia.

== Nontyphoidal Salmonella ==
=== Gastroenteritis ===
Infection with nontyphoidal serotypes of Salmonella generally results in gastroenteritis or what is commonly called food poisoning. Experimental infections of healthy adults suggest that Infection usually occurs when a person ingests a high concentration of the bacteria but studies of outbreaks from contaminated food suggests that much lower doses can result in infection. Infants, young children and the elderly are likely to be more susceptible to infection, easily achieved by ingesting a small number of bacteria, although direct evidence of this is not available. In infants, infection through inhalation of bacteria-laden dust is possible.

The organisms enter through the digestive tract. Infection is initiated after Salmonella reach the gastrointestinal tract. Gastric acidity is responsible for the destruction of the majority of ingested bacteria, but Salmonella has evolved a degree of tolerance to acidic environments that allows a subset of ingested bacteria to survive. Some of the microorganisms are killed in the stomach, while the surviving ones enter the small intestine, invade cells of the epithelium and multiply within the cells in tissues. Salmonella triggers a strong immune response through a number of mechanisms that leads to inflammatory diarrhoea typical of gastroenteritis. The inflammatory response also results in changes to the good bacteria resident in the gut lumen, that favours outgrowth of the Salmonella at this location. Consequently, a combination of high numbers of Salmonella in the faeces and diarrhoea contributes to transmission via contamination of the environment.

About 2,000 serotypes of nontyphoidal Salmonella are known, which may be responsible for as many as 1.4 million illnesses in the United States each year. People who are at risk for severe illness include infants, elderly, organ-transplant recipients, and the immunocompromised.

=== Disseminated disease (or invasive nontyphoidal Salmonella disease, iNTS) ===
Child deaths from invasive non typhoidal salmonella

While, in developed countries, non-typhoidal serotypes present mostly as gastrointestinal disease, in sub-Saharan Africa, these serotypes can create a major problem in bloodstream infections, and are the most commonly isolated bacteria from the blood of those presenting with fever. Bloodstream infections caused by nontyphoidal salmonellae in Africa are normally associated with co-morbidities including Malaria, HIV and malnutrition, and were reported in 2012 to have a case fatality rate of 20–25%. Most cases of invasive nontyphoidal Salmonella infection (iNTS) are caused by Salmonella enterica Typhimurium or Salmonella enterica Enteritidis. A new form of Salmonella Typhimurium (ST313, lineage I) emerged in the southeast of the African continent 75 years ago, followed by a second wave (ST313, lineage II) which came out of central Africa 18 years later. This second wave of iNTS possibly originated in the Congo Basin, was characterized by changes in its genome sequence called genome degradation that is typical of host-adapted and host restricted serotypes such as Salmonella enterica serotype Typhi. Spread of the second wave in the early part of the 21st century was coincided with acquisition of a gene that made it resistant to the antibiotic chloramphenicol. This created the need to use expensive antimicrobial drugs in areas of Africa that were very poor, making treatment difficult. The increased prevalence of iNTS in sub-Saharan Africa compared to other regions is thought to be due to the large proportion of the African population with some degree of immune suppression or impairment due to the burden of HIV, malaria, and malnutrition, especially in children. The genetic makeup of iNTS is evolving into a more typhoid-like bacterium, able to efficiently spread around the human body. Symptoms are reported to be diverse, including fever, hepatosplenomegaly, and respiratory symptoms, often with an absence of gastrointestinal symptoms.

=== Epidemiology ===
Due to being considered sporadic, between 60% and 80% of salmonella infections cases go undiagnosed. In March 2010, data analysis was completed to estimate an incidence rate of 1140 per 100,000 person-years. In the same analysis, 93.8 million cases of gastroenteritis were due to salmonella infections. At the 5th percentile the estimated amount was 61.8 million cases and at the 95th percentile the estimated amount was 131.6 million cases. The estimated number of deaths due to salmonella was approximately 155,000 deaths. In 2014, in countries such as Bulgaria and Portugal, children under 4 were 32 and 82 times more likely, respectively, to have a salmonella infection. Those who are most susceptible to infection are: children, pregnant women, elderly people, and those with deficient immune systems.

Risk factors for Salmonella infections include a variety of foods. Meats such as chicken and pork have the possibility to be contaminated. A variety of vegetables and sprouts may also have salmonella. Lastly, a variety of processed foods such as chicken nuggets and pot pies may also contain this bacteria.

Successful forms of prevention come from existing entities such as the FDA, United States Department of Agriculture, and the Food Safety and Inspection Service. All of these organizations create standards and inspections to ensure public safety in the U.S. For example, the FSIS agency working with the USDA has a Salmonella Action Plan in place. Recently, it received a two-year plan update in February 2016. Their accomplishments and strategies to reduce Salmonella infection are presented in the plans. The Centers for Disease Control and Prevention also provides valuable information on preventative care, such has how to safely handle raw foods, and the correct way to store these products. In the European Union, the European Food Safety Authority created preventative measures through risk management and risk assessment. From 2005 to 2009, the EFSA placed an approach to reduce exposure to Salmonella. Their approach included risk assessment and risk management of poultry, which resulted in a reduction of infection cases by one half. In Latin America an orally administered vaccine for Salmonella in poultry developed by Dr. Sherry Layton has been introduced which prevents the bacteria from contaminating the birds.

A Salmonella Typhimurium outbreak in 2022 was linked to chocolate produced in Belgium, leading to the country temporarily halting Kinder chocolate production.

In Germany, food-borne infections must be reported. From 1990 to 2016, the number of officially recorded cases decreased from about 200,000 to about 13,000 cases. In the United States, about 1,200,000 cases of Salmonella infection are estimated to occur each year. A World Health Organization study estimated that 21,650,974 cases of typhoid fever occurred in 2000, 216,510 of which resulted in death, along with 5,412,744 cases of paratyphoid fever.

== Molecular mechanisms of infection ==
The mechanisms of infection differ between typhoidal and nontyphoidal serotypes, owing to their different targets in the body and the different symptoms that they cause. Both groups must enter by crossing the barrier created by the intestinal cell wall, but once they have passed this barrier, they use different strategies to cause infection.

=== Switch to virulence ===
While travelling to their target tissue in the gastrointestinal tract, Salmonella is exposed to stomach acid, to the detergent-like activity of bile in the intestine, to decreasing oxygen supply, to the competing normal gut flora, and finally to antimicrobial peptides present on the surface of the cells lining the intestinal wall. All of these form stresses that Salmonella can sense and reacts against, and they form virulence factors and as such regulate the switch from their normal growth in the intestine into virulence.

The switch to virulence gives access to a replication niche inside the host (such as humans), and can be summarised into several stages:

1. Approach, in which they travel towards a host cell via intestinal peristalsis and through active swimming via the flagella, penetrate the mucus barrier, and locate themselves close to the epithelium lining the intestine,
2. Adhesion, in which they adhere to a host cell using bacterial adhesins and a type III secretion system,
3. Invasion, in which Salmonella enter the host cell (see variant mechanisms below),
4. Replication, in which the bacterium may reproduce inside the host cell,
5. Spread, in which the bacterium can spread to other organs via cells in the blood (if it succeeded in avoiding the immune defence). Alternatively, bacteria can go back towards the intestine, re-seeding the intestinal population.
6. Re-invasion (a secondary infection, if now at a systemic site) and further replication.

=== Mechanisms of entry ===
Nontyphoidal serotypes preferentially enter M cells on the intestinal wall by bacterial-mediated endocytosis, a process associated with intestinal inflammation and diarrhoea. They are also able to disrupt tight junctions between the cells of the intestinal wall, impairing the cells' ability to stop the flow of ions, water, and immune cells into and out of the intestine. The combination of the inflammation caused by bacterial-mediated endocytosis and the disruption of tight junctions is thought to contribute significantly to the induction of diarrhoea.

Salmonellae are also able to breach the intestinal barrier via phagocytosis and trafficking by CD18-positive immune cells, which may be a mechanism key to typhoidal Salmonella infection. This is thought to be a more stealthy way of passing the intestinal barrier, and may, therefore, contribute to the fact that lower numbers of typhoidal Salmonella are required for infection than nontyphoidal Salmonella. Salmonella cells are able to enter macrophages via macropinocytosis. Typhoidal serotypes can use this to achieve dissemination throughout the body via the mononuclear phagocyte system, a network of connective tissue that contains immune cells, and surrounds tissue associated with the immune system throughout the body.

Much of the success of Salmonella in causing infection is attributed to two type III secretion systems (T3SS) which are expressed at different times during the infection. The T3SS-1 enables the injection of bacterial effectors within the host cytosol. These T3SS-1 effectors stimulate the formation of membrane ruffles allowing the uptake of Salmonella by nonphagocytic cells. Salmonella further resides within a membrane-bound compartment called the Salmonella-Containing Vacuole (SCV). The acidification of the SCV leads to the expression of the T3SS-2. The secretion of T3SS-2 effectors by Salmonella is required for its efficient survival in the host cytosol and establishment of systemic disease. In addition, both T3SS are involved in the colonization of the intestine, induction of intestinal inflammatory responses and diarrhea. These systems contain many genes which must work cooperatively to achieve infection.

The AvrA toxin injected by the SPI1 type III secretion system of S. Typhimurium works to inhibit the innate immune system by virtue of its serine/threonine acetyltransferase activity, and requires binding to eukaryotic target cell phytic acid (IP6). This leaves the host more susceptible to infection.

=== Clinical symptoms ===
Salmonellosis is known to be able to cause back pain or spondylosis. It can manifest as five clinical patterns: gastrointestinal tract infection, enteric fever, bacteremia, local infection, and the chronic reservoir state. The initial symptoms are nonspecific fever, weakness, and myalgia among others. In the bacteremia state, it can spread to any parts of the body and this induces localized infection or it forms abscesses. The forms of localized Salmonella infections are arthritis, urinary tract infection, infection of the central nervous system, bone infection, soft tissue infection, etc. Infection may remain as the latent form for a long time, and when the function of reticular endothelial cells is deteriorated, it may become activated and consequently, it may secondarily induce spreading infection in the bone several months or several years after acute salmonellosis.

A 2018 Imperial College London study also shows how salmonella disrupt specific arms of the immune system (e.g. 3 of 5 NF-kappaB proteins) using a family of zinc metalloproteinase effectors, leaving others untouched. Salmonella thyroid abscess has also been reported.

== Resistance to oxidative burst ==
A hallmark of Salmonella pathogenesis is the ability of the bacterium to survive and proliferate within phagocytes. Phagocytes produce DNA-damaging agents such as nitric oxide and oxygen radicals as a defense against pathogens. Thus, Salmonella species must face attack by molecules that challenge genome integrity. Buchmeier et al. showed that mutants of S. enterica lacking RecA or RecBC protein function are highly sensitive to oxidative compounds synthesized by macrophages, and furthermore these findings indicate that successful systemic infection by S. enterica requires RecA- and RecBC-mediated recombinational repair of DNA damage.

== Host adaptation ==
S. enterica, through some of its serotypes such as Typhimurium and Enteritidis, shows signs that it has the ability to infect several different mammalian host species, while other serotypes, such as Typhi, seem to be restricted to only a few hosts. Two ways that Salmonella serotypes have adapted to their hosts are by the loss of genetic material, and mutation. In more complex mammalian species, immune systems, which include pathogen specific immune responses, target serovars of Salmonella by binding antibodies to structures such as flagella. Thus Salmonella that has lost the genetic material which codes for a flagellum to form can evade a host's immune system. mgtC leader RNA from bacteria virulence gene (mgtCBR operon) decreases flagellin production during infection by directly base pairing with mRNAs of the fljB gene encoding flagellin and promotes degradation. In the study by Kisela et al., more pathogenic serovars of S. enterica were found to have certain adhesins in common that have developed out of convergent evolution. This means that, as these strains of Salmonella have been exposed to similar conditions such as immune systems, similar structures evolved separately to negate these similar, more advanced defenses in hosts. Although many questions remain about how Salmonella has evolved into so many different types, Salmonella may have evolved through several phases. For example, as Baumler et al. have suggested, Salmonella most likely evolved through horizontal gene transfer, and through the formation of new serovars due to additional pathogenicity islands, and through an approximation of its ancestry. So, Salmonella could have evolved into its many different serotypes by gaining genetic information from different pathogenic bacteria. The presence of several pathogenicity islands in the genome of different serotypes has lent credence to this theory.

Salmonella sv. Newport shows signs of adaptation to a plant-colonization lifestyle, which may play a role in its disproportionate association with food-borne illness linked to produce. A variety of functions selected for during sv. Newport persistence in tomatoes have been reported to be similar to those selected for in sv. Typhimurium from animal hosts. The papA gene, which is unique to sv. Newport, contributes to the strain's fitness in tomatoes, and has homologs in the genomes of other Enterobacteriaceae that are able to colonize plant and animal hosts.

== Research ==
In addition to their importance as pathogens, nontyphoidal Salmonella species such as S. enterica serovar Typhimurium are commonly used as homologues of typhoid species. Many findings are transferable and it attenuates the danger for the researcher in case of contamination, but is also limited. For example, it is not possible to study specific typhoidal toxins using this model. However, strong research tools such as the commonly used mouse intestine gastroenteritis model build upon the use of Salmonella Typhimurium.

For genetics, S. Typhimurium has been instrumental in the development of genetic tools that led to an understanding of fundamental bacterial physiology. These developments were enabled by the discovery of the first generalized transducing phage P22 in S. Typhimurium, that allowed quick and easy genetic editing. In turn, this made fine structure genetic analysis possible. The large number of mutants led to a revision of genetic nomenclature for bacteria. Many of the uses of transposons as genetic tools, including transposon delivery, mutagenesis, and construction of chromosome rearrangements, were also developed in S. Typhimurium. These genetic tools also led to a simple test for carcinogens, the Ames test.

As a natural alternative to traditional antimicrobials, phages are being recognised as highly effective control agents for Salmonella and other foodborne bacteria.

== Ancient DNA ==
S. enterica genomes have been reconstructed from up to 6,500 year old human remains across Western Eurasia, which provides evidence for geographic widespread infections with systemic S. enterica during prehistory, and a possible role of the Neolithization process in the evolution of host adaptation. Additional reconstructed genomes from colonial Mexico suggest S. enterica as the cause of cocoliztli, an epidemic in 16th-century New Spain.

== See also ==
- 1984 Rajneeshee bioterror attack
- 2008 United States salmonellosis outbreak
- American Public Health Association v. Butz
- Bismuth sulfite agar
- Food testing strips
- Host–pathogen interaction
- List of foodborne illness outbreaks
- 2008–2009 peanut-borne salmonellosis
- Wright County Egg
- XLD agar
