= Salmonella bongori =

Scientific classification
- Domain: Bacteria
- Kingdom: Pseudomonadati
- Phylum: Pseudomonadota
- Class: Gammaproteobacteria
- Order: Enterobacterales
- Family: Enterobacteriaceae
- Genus: Salmonella
- Species: S. bongori

Binomial name
- Salmonella bongori (Le Minor et al. 1985) Reeves et al. 1989

Species of bacterium

Salmonella bongori is a pathogenic bacterium belonging to the genus Salmonella, and was earlier known as Salmonella subspecies V or S. enterica subsp. bongori or S. choleraesuis subsp. bongori. It is a gram-negative, rod-shaped bacterium (bacillus), which causes a gastrointestinal disease called salmonellosis, characterized by cramping and diarrhoea. It is typically considered a microbe of cold-blooded animals, unlike other members of the genus, and is most frequently associated with reptiles.

It was discovered in 1966 from a lizard in the city of Bongor, Chad, from which the specific name bongori was derived. After decades of controversy in Salmonella nomenclature, it gained the species status in 2005.

== Pathogenicity and epidemiology ==
S. bongori is classically regarded as the Salmonella of lizards. However, discrete investigations contradict the notion of strict host-specificity, as reports emerged of occurrence in dogs and birds. In animals, unlike those of other Salmonella, infection is generally asymptomatic and does not cause discernible effects. However, infection of pet animals is associated with diarrhea.

Further, human infections have been substantiated, with conclusive reports from Italy. The majority of these cases are among children less than 3 years old, who are more prone to oral contact with animal droppings. Symptoms are typified by diarrhoea with fever and acute enteritis. The first observations, from Messina and Palermo, starting from late 1984, were followed by other cities in Sicily.

== Origin and evolution ==
Originally S. bongori was considered to be a subspecies within the genus Salmonella. However, based on DNA similarity, all members of Salmonella are now grouped into only two species, namely S. bongori and S. enterica. Species of Salmonella are closely related to E. coli and they are estimated to have diverged from a common ancestor about 100 million years ago; their genomes still display significant similarity, hence many functional identities. Many of the genes which are unique to Salmonella serovars, compared to E. coli, are found on large discrete genomic islands such as Salmonella pathogenicity islands (SPIs). These Salmonella-specific functions include many genes for their virulence and characterize the divergence of S. enterica from S. bongori. For instance, the SPI-2 gene which encodes type III secretion systems present in S. enterica is absent in S. bongori. Also, the virulence determinants, specifically effector proteins, are indicated to be more closely related to enteropathogenic E. coli because some of the gene are missing in S. enterica.
