= Joseph Leon Lignières =

French-Argentinian veterinarian and bacteriologist

Joseph Leon Marcel Lignières (March 26, 1868, Saint-Mihiel, Meuse, France – October 19, 1933, Buenos Aires, Argentina) was a French-Argentinian veterinarian and bacteriologist, the binomial authority for the Salmonella genus of bacteria.

== Biography ==
Joseph Léon Marcel Lignières was born in Saint-Mihiel, Meuse. He studied at the École vétérinaire d'Alfort from 1886 to 1890. In late 1890, he was appointed assistant repeater of the chair of contagious diseases, presided over by Edmond Nocard. He became chief of studies in 1894 until January 1898. During this period, Joseph Léon Lignières described the genus of mites Hemisarcoptes and began his bacteriological career with the study of pasteurelloses, describing in 1898 hemorrhagic septicemia in sheep and in 1900 Pasteurellosis.

On January 1, 1898, he was assigned a mission in Argentina to study infectious diseases such as "tristeza" and "bovine malaria". His mission renewed, led him to organize the bacteriology laboratory in Buenos Aires. He studied salmonelloses and described the genus Salmonella in 1900. He then worked on serums and vaccines, including foot-and-mouth disease vaccine, bovine malaria, bovine anaplasmosis, bovine piroplasmosis (Texas fever), and mal de Caderas.

Joseph Léon Lignières became a professor of bacteriology at the Faculty of Veterinary Medicine and Agronomy of Buenos Aires and director of the National Institute of Bacteriology of the same city.

He described actinobacillosis and isolated Actinobacillus and worked on actinomycoses, gastrointestinal strongylosis of sheep, and foot-and-mouth disease. In 1912, he published the first description of sheep atherosclerosis.
