= Froop! =

Card game

Froop! is a card game published by Savant Garde Entertainment in 2002.

== Gameplay ==
Froop! is an abstract strategy card game.

== Reviews ==
- Pyramid
- Scrye
