= Rappaport Vassiliadis soya peptone broth =

Enrichment growth medium

Rappaport-Vassiliadis soya peptone broth (RVS broth) is used as an enrichment growth medium for the isolation of Salmonella species. It is not recommended for the enrichment of Salmonella Typhi or Paratyphi, which is inhibited due to the malachite green in RVS broth. It is an alternative to selenite broth. It is not associated with potential teratogenicity problems seen with the use of selenite broth. It enriches salmonellae because they are better able to survive the high osmotic pressure in the medium and because they can multiply at relatively lower pH and higher temperatures compared with other gut bacteria. RVS broth has a pH around 5.2.

== Components ==
A liter of RVS broth contains:

- 4.5g Soya peptone
- 7.2g Sodium chloride
- 1.26g Potassium dihydrogen phosphate
- 0.18g Dipotassium phosphate
- 13.58g Magnesium chloride (anhydrous)
- 0.036g Malachite green
