= Microbe Hunters =

1926 nonfiction book by Paul de Kruif

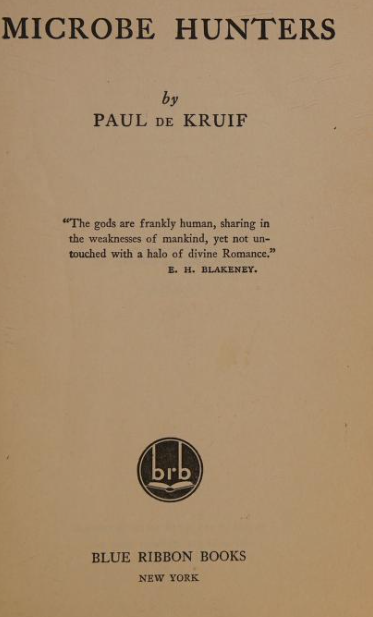
- Title page for Microbe Hunters (1926)
- Author: Paul de Kruif
- Language: English
- Genre: Popular science
- Publisher: Harcourt, Brace and Company
- Publication date: 1926
- Publication place: United States
- Media type: Print (Hardback)

Microbe Hunters is a popular science book written by Paul de Kruif and first published in 1926. The book has been celebrated as one of the most influential books for drawing scientists into the fields of microbiology and immunology. This book was not only a bestseller for a lengthy period after publication, but has remained high on lists of recommended reading for science and has been an inspiration for many aspiring physicians and scientists.

== Scientists showcased ==
De Kruif's Microbe Hunters consists of chapters on the following figures of medicine's "Heroic Age":

- Anton van Leeuwenhoek (1632–1723) – the invention of a simple microscope and the discovery of microorganisms.
- Lazzaro Spallanzani (1729–1799) – biogenesis.
- Robert Koch (1843–1910) – identification of pathogens.
- Louis Pasteur (1822–1895) – bacteria, biogenesis.
- Emile Roux (1853–1933) and Emil von Behring (1854–1917) – diphtheria.
- Elie Metchnikoff (1845–1916) – phagocytes.
- Theobald Smith (1859–1934) – animal vectors and ticks.
- David Bruce (1855–1931) – tsetse flies and sleeping sickness.
- Ronald Ross (1857–1932) and Battista Grassi (1854–1925) – malaria.
- Walter Reed (1851–1902) – yellow fever.
- Paul Ehrlich (1854–1915) – the magic-bullet concept applied to syphilis (see the 1940 film Dr. Ehrlich's Magic Bullet).
