= Bureau of Animal Industry =

American federal government organization

The Bureau of Animal Industry (BAI) was an organization that was established under the United States Department of Agriculture. It replaced the Veterinary Division that had been created by the Commissioner of Agriculture in 1883, which had taken over for the Treasury Cattle Commission, Department of Treasury. The Bureau was created upon president Chester A. Arthur signing the Animal Industry Act (23 STAT 31) on May 29, 1884.

The BAI was charged with preventing diseased animals from being used as food. Congress created the Bureau to promote livestock disease research, enforce animal import regulations, and regulate the interstate movement of animals. In the years to follow, positions were created within BAI to support inspection activities at U.S. ports of entry. The early focus of the bureau was to eradicate the most damaging, most communicable livestock diseases. Throughout its history, the Bureau of Animal Industry had many other important divisions, most notable of these were Animal Husbandry, Animal Nutrition, Animal Pathology, Dairy, and Zoological. These divisions had a multitude of tasks related to animal industry, including: research, disease eradication, breeding, inspection, and even marketing of animal products.

By August 1884, the Treasury Department's quarantine stations were transferred to the BAI. Stations in Baltimore, New York, Boston, and Philadelphia, along with the customs' offices on the Canadian and Mexican borders, these stations served as safeguards against foreign animal diseases.

The BAI, under the direction of the United States Department of Agriculture (USDA) ran from 1884 to 1942 on its own. In 1942 the BAI became part of the Agricultural Research Administration by Executive Order 9069 on Feb. 23, 1942. In 1953 the BAI was abolished by Secretary's Memorandum 1320, supplement 4 on November 2, 1953. The Dwight Eisenhower Administration made major organizational changes at the USDA. Scientific bureaus, including the Bureau of Animal Industry were abolished and their functions were transferred to the newly established Agricultural Research Service (ARS). Its duties were divided among several branches: Animal Disease and Parasite Research, Animal and Poultry Husbandry Research, Animal Disease Eradication, Animal Inspection, and Quarantine and Meat Inspection all under the Agricultural Research Service (ARS).

== Legislation and duties ==
On August 30, 1890, President Benjamin Harrison signed the first law requiring inspection of meat products. The law required that United States Department of Agriculture (USDA), through the Bureau of Animal Industry, to inspect salted pork and bacon intended for exportation. In 1891, this law was amended to require the inspection and certification of all live cattle and beef intended for exportation.

In 1905, the BAI faced intense pressure to improve meat inspections after the publication of Upton Sinclair's book The Jungle. The ground breaking book exposed unsanitary conditions in the Chicago meat-packing industry which caused enormous public outrage. President Theodore Roosevelt commissioned the Neill-Reynolds' report, written by labor commissioner Charles P. Neill and sociologist James Bronson Reynolds, which confirmed many of Sinclair's horrifying tales. In response to both The Jungle and the Neill-Reynolds report, Congress passed the Federal Meat Inspection Act ,(21 USC 601 et seq.) in June 1906. The BAI was assigned the task of enforcing the Federal Meat Inspection Act (FMIA).

The FMIA established four major sanitary requirements for the meat packing industry. The Act required mandatory inspection of livestock before and immediately after of every carcass and set very specific sanitary standards for slaughterhouses. The FMIA allowed the USDA to issue grants of inspection and monitor slaughter and processing operations, which allowed them to enforce food safety regulatory requirements. Following passage of the 1906 Act, BAI's Meat Inspection Division hired more than 1,300 inspectors to work at 163 establishments. In 1907, the number employed by BAI was more than 2,200 inspectors at close to 700 establishments. In 1910, the Meat Inspection Division established a research center in Beltsville, Maryland. Seven similar laboratories were later created throughout the country. These laboratories were responsible both for developing new testing methods and testing meat and meat products for foreign substances.

Starting in 1912, BAI also inspected eggs for the Navy, long before USDA inspected them for the market and the public.

== Related laws and acts ==
Food and Rest Act June 29, 1906 (Transportation of Animals) (34 Stat. 607) also known as “Live Stock Transportation Act” and also as the “Cruelty to Animals Act”, “Twenty-Eight Hour Law”, and “Food and Rest Law”. Deals with the transportation of live animals for human consumption. If transported longer than 28 hours, they are to be fed, water and unloaded (with the exception of sheep, which can go for 36 hours).

Virus-Serum-Toxin Act 1913 (21 USC 151-158) This law was enacted largely because of public concern over the importation of contaminated veterinary vaccines from Europe and in reaction to complaints about worthless and contaminated hog cholera products being sold throughout the country. The new law required the USDA to ensure that veterinary biologics (vaccines, bacterins, antiserums and similar products) sold in interstate commerce are pure, safe, potent, and efficacious. In 1985, the Virus-Serum-Toxin Act was amended to include biologics sold intrastate.

Packers and Stockyards Act of 1921 (7 U.S.C. 181 et seq.) was brought to regulate interstate and foreign commerce to stop what was perceived to be manipulation by the packers and stockyard owners in regards to live stock prices.

Federal Food, Drug and Cosmetic Act 1939 (21 USC 301) which dealt prohibiting the movement in interstate commerce with adulterated or misbranded food.

In 1946, the scope of inspection was expanded with the passage of The Agricultural Marketing Act (AMA), (7 U.S.C. 1621 et seq..) which allowed for inspection of exotic and game animals on a fee-for-service basis. The 1946 Act also provided USDA the authority to inspect, certify and identify the class, quality and condition of agricultural products.

== Directors and other notable people ==
Daniel Elmer Salmon (1850-1914) who had supervised the veterinary disease experiment station for the USDA the previous year, became the first director of the Bureau of Animal Industry. The original intent of the BAI was to study animal diseases that had been causing problems with domestic and global livestock, so Salmon was an excellent choice. His work contributed immeasurably to improving public health and disease control efforts.

Dr. A. D. Melvin (1862-1917) was the second director of the BA1905 until his death in 1917. Melvin graduated from Chicago Veterinary College and started working for the Department of Agriculture in 1886. He started inspecting animals for disease and soon became the Chief of the Meat Inspection Division in 1895. He then became Assistant Chief of the BAI in 1890 and became Chief in December 1905.

Dr. John R Mohler (1875-1952) began his work with the USDA as an assistant inspector for the BAI in 1897. He then moved on to become the Chief of the Pathological Division in 1902. Mohler then became Chief of the Bureau of Animal Industry in 1917 and held that post until his retirement in 1943. Mohler focused on animal diseases, specifically those that affected cattle, birds, sheep, horses, and hogs. He wrote and co-wrote many bulletins, circulars, and articles on these topics. In 1939 Mohler received the 12th International Veterinary Congress Prize in recognition of his outstanding achievements in veterinary service, this is the highest honor the veterinary profession bestows.

Eloise Blaine Cram (1897-1957) graduated Phi Beta Kappa from the University of Chicago in 1919, and received her Ph.D. from George Washington University in 1925. In 1920 Cram started working as a zoologist for the USDA's Bureau of Animal Industry (BAI), where she was noted as an authority on the parasites of poultry, and eventually gained the position as Head of Parasites of Poultry and Game Birds. In 1936, Cram left the BAI to take a position at the Zoology Lab of the National Institutes of Health (NIH) where her major contribution to parasitology was her pioneering research into the curbing of the helminthic (produced by worms) disease Schistosomiasis. Cram had produced over 160 papers and monographs on various subjects relating to animal parasitology and had become an international authority on helminthic diseases. In 1955 she served as the only woman president of the American Society of Parasitologists.

Maurice Crowther Hall (1881-1938) became a zoologist for the Bureau of Animal Industry from 1907-1916 when he then entered the United States Army's Veterinary Corps after which Hall returned to his former position with the BAI. In 1925 he was promoted to head of the BAI's Zoological Division. In 1921 Hall discovered that carbon tetrachloride was incredibly effective as an anthelminthic in eradicating hookworm. His discovery played a vital role in the worldwide destruction of hookworm. Hall also oversaw the construction of the Zoological Division's first field station, in Beltsville, MD. Hall served in 1930 as the president of the American Veterinary Medical Association and in 1932 was president of the American Society of Parasitologists. Hall left the BAI in 1936 to become the Head of the Zoological Laboratory at the National Institutes of Health.

Albert Hassall (1862-1942) began working for the BAI in 1887 as a Veterinary Inspector. In 1891 he was made an Assistant in BAI's Division of Pathology. In 1904 he became an Assistant in Zoology in BAI's Zoological Division, he was then promoted to Assistant Zoologist in 1910. Hassall then became Assistant Chief of the Division in 1928 until his forced retirement in 1932. Hassall's biggest contribution to the BAI was compiling the Index-Catalogue of Medical and Veterinary Zoology, a comprehensive reference work on parasitology. The Royal College of Veterinary Surgeons in London, awarded Hassall the coveted Steele Medal in 1932 for his work on this crucially important reference and research tool.

== Publications ==
The Bureau of Animal Industry published many Bulletins and Circulars. Here is a selection:

- "Circular 46". First International Dairy Congress at Brussels, in 1903 (Report). United States Department of Agriculture, Bureau of Animal Industry. 1904.
- "Circular 151". Competitive Exhibitions of Milk and Cream (Report). United States Department of Agriculture, Bureau of Animal Industry. 1909.
- "Circular 114". Sanitary Milk Production (Report). United States Department of Agriculture, Bureau of Animal Industry. 20 August 1907.
- "Circular 213". The Governments Inspection and Quarantine Service Relating to the Importation and Exportation of Livestock (Report). United States Department of Agriculture, Bureau of Animal Industry. 1913.
- "Bulletin 1". Nature, Causation and Prevention of Texas Fever (Report). United States Department of Agriculture, Bureau of Animal Industry. 1893.
- Improvement of the Egg Farm (Report). United States Department of Agriculture, Bureau of Animal Industry. 12 September 1911.
