= Paul de Kruif =

American microbiologist and author (1890–1971)

Paul Henry de Kruif (/dəˈkraɪf/, rhyming with "life") (March 2, 1890 – February 28, 1971) was an American microbiologist and writer. Publishing as Paul de Kruif, he is known for his 1926 book, Microbe Hunters. This book was not only a bestseller for a lengthy period after publication, but has remained high on lists of recommended reading for science and has been an inspiration for many aspiring physicians and scientists.

== Biography ==
=== Early life ===
De Kruif was born March 2, 1890, in Zeeland, Michigan. In 1912, he graduated from the University of Michigan with a bachelor's degree, and he remained there to obtain a Ph.D., which was granted in 1916. He immediately entered service as a private in Mexico on the Pancho Villa Expedition and afterwards served as a lieutenant and a captain in World War I in France. Because of his service in the Sanitary Corps, he had occasional contacts with leading French biologists of the period.

=== Career ===
After returning to the University of Michigan as an assistant professor, De Kruif briefly worked for the Rockefeller Institute (for Medical Research). He then became a full-time writer.

De Kruif assisted Sinclair Lewis with his Pulitzer Prize-winning novel Arrowsmith (1925) by providing the scientific and medical information required by the plot, along with character sketches. Even though Lewis was listed as the sole author, De Kruif's contribution was significant, and he received 25 percent of the royalties. Many believe the characters in the novel represent people known to De Kruif, with Martin Arrowsmith (a physician, unlike de Kruif) possibly representing himself.

While working for the Rockefeller Institute, De Kruif submitted an anonymous entry about modern medicine, for a book entitled Civilization. In the article, he decried the state of contemporary medical practice, which, because it lacked scientifically sound practices, he called "medical Ga-Ga-ism". De Kruif decried doctors as providing only a "mélange of religious ritual, more or less accurate folk-lore, and commercial cunning". When it was discovered that De Kruif was the author of the essay, he was fired from the Rockefeller Institute.

Ronald Ross, one of the scientists featured in Microbe Hunters, took exception to how he was described, so the British edition deleted that chapter to avoid a libel suit.

De Kruif was a staff writer for the Ladies' Home Journal, Country Gentleman, and Reader's Digest, contributing articles on science and medicine. He also served on commissions to promote research into infantile paralysis (polio).

De Kruif's book "Hunger Fighters" (1928) featured the story of Joseph Goldberger's experiments with inducing pellagra in convicts in a US prison (proving that the disease was caused by improper diet and not any kind of microbe); this chapter of the de Kruif book was, ironically, later cited by Nazi scientists as one of the inspirations for their own proposal to use convicts for their infamous medical experiments.

The Sweeping Wind, De Kruif's last book, is his autobiography.

De Kruif died February 28, 1971, in Holland, Michigan.

== Works ==
- Our Medicine Men (1922)
- Microbe Hunters (1926)
- Hunger Fighters (1928)
- Seven Iron Men (1929)
- Men Against Death (1932)
- Why Keep Them Alive (1937)
- The Fight for Life (1938)
- The Male Hormone (1945)
- Health is Wealth (1940)
- Kaiser Wakes the Doctors (1940)
- Life Among the Doctors (1949)
- A Man Against Insanity (1957)
- The Sweeping Wind (1962)

=== Selected articles ===
- "How We Can Help Feed Europe", in Reader's Digest, Sept. 1945 (p. 50-52). About the Meals for Millions Foundation and their Multi-Purpose Food.
