= The Food Defect Action Levels =

US FDA publication on food contamination

The Food Defect Action Levels: Levels of Natural or Unavoidable Defects in Foods That Present No Health Hazards for Humans is a publication of the United States Food and Drug Administration's Center for Food Safety and Applied Nutrition detailing acceptable levels of food contamination from sources such as maggots, thrips, insect fragments, "foreign matter", mold, rodent hairs, and insect and mammalian feces.

The publication details the acceptable amounts of contaminants on a per food basis, listing both the defect source (pre-harvest infection, processing infestation, processing contamination, etc.) and significance (aesthetic, potential health hazard, mouth/tooth injury, etc.). For example, the limit of insect contaminants allowed in canned or frozen peaches is specified as: "In 12 1-pound cans or equivalent, one or more larvae and/or larval fragments whose aggregate length exceeds 5 mm."

The Food Defect Action Levels was first published in 1995. A printed version of the publication may be obtained by written request to the Food and Drug Administration or see External links below.

== Health hazards ==
The insect fragments are classified as an aesthetic problem. The Food Defect Action Levels states that these contaminants "pose no inherent hazard to health".

== Additional examples ==
Product	Type of insect contamination	Action Level
Canned sweet corn	Insect larvae (corn ear worms or corn borers)	2 or more 3 mm or longer larvae, cast skins, larval or cast skin fragments, the aggregate length of insects or insect parts exceeds 12 mm in 24 pounds
Canned citrus fruit juices	Insects and insect eggs	5 or more Drosophila and other fly eggs per 250 ml or 1 or more maggots per 250 ml
Canned apricots	Insect filth	Average of 2% or more by count has been damaged or infected by insects
Chocolate and chocolate liquor	Insect filth	Average is 60 or more insect fragments per 100 grams (when 6 100 g subsamples are examined)
Peanut butter	Insect filth	Average of 30 or more insect fragments per 100 grams
Wheat flour	Insect filth	Average of 150 or more insect fragments per 100 grams
Frozen broccoli	Insects and mites	Average of 60 or more aphids and/or thrips and/or mites per 100 grams
Hops	Insects	Average of more than 2,500 aphids per 10 grams
Ground thyme	Insect filth	Average of 925 or more insect fragments per 10 grams
Ground nutmeg	Insect filth	Average of 100 or more insect fragments per 10 grams
Ground cinnamon	Insect filth	Average of 400 or more insect fragments per 50 grams
Shredded carrots	Insect filth	Average of 800 or more insect fragments per 10 grams

== See also ==
- Home stored product entomology
- Food safety
- Insects as food
- Criticism of the Food and Drug Administration
