= Peanut paste =

Product obtained from peanuts

Peanut paste is a product of peanuts used in sauces, cookies, crackers (and other baked goods), breakfast cereals and ice cream.

'Peanut paste' is the main ingredient in some peanut butter recipes.

== Method ==
Peanut paste is obtained by several methods in which raw peanuts are roasted, blanched, and ground to create the peanut paste.

== Distinction from peanut butter ==
The distinction between peanut paste and peanut butter is not always clear cut in ordinary use.

=== Food labelling in Australia ===
The term has been used in Queensland, Australia, as a synonym for peanut butter. This followed pressure from dairy farmers who did not want peanut butter competing with butter for market share.

The product was known in Western Australia and South Australia for many years as peanut paste because, by definition, butter is a dairy product. The same product was available in other states as peanut butter. Manufacturers complained about having to produce different labels for different states and the Western Australian government changed the rules on the use of the word butter to allow for one set of labels.

=== As ingredient of peanut butter ===
Peanut butter may be made from peanut paste mixed with a stabilizing agent, a sweetening agent, salt, and optionally, an emulsifying agent. In such formulas, peanut paste acts as the main ingredient in peanut butter, from 75% to as much as 99% of the recipe. Peanut butter is mainly known for being sold as a spread, and peanut paste is regularly sold to be used as an ingredient in cookies, cakes and a number of other retail food products.

== See also ==
- List of peanut dishes
