= American Candy Company =

American confectionery

- Industry: Confectionery
- Founded: 1899; 126 years ago
- Headquarters: Denver, Colorado, United States
- Products: Old-fashioned hard candies
- Owner: Pinkerton Group
- Parent: Tootsie Roll Industries

The American Candy Company is a confectioner specializing in old-fashioned hard candies.

== History ==
The American Candy Company was founded in 1899 in Selma, Alabama. The company was sold by the Gibian Family in 1989 to the Pinkerton Group in Richmond, Virginia. Their wax candy division was sold to Concord Confections in 2002, and this division is now part of Tootsie Roll Industries.

== Products ==
- Twirl Pops
- Old Fashioned Sticks
- Candy Canes
- Starlight Mints
- Lollipops
- Long Boy Soft Chews
